= Hivesville, Queensland =

Hivesville
- Town
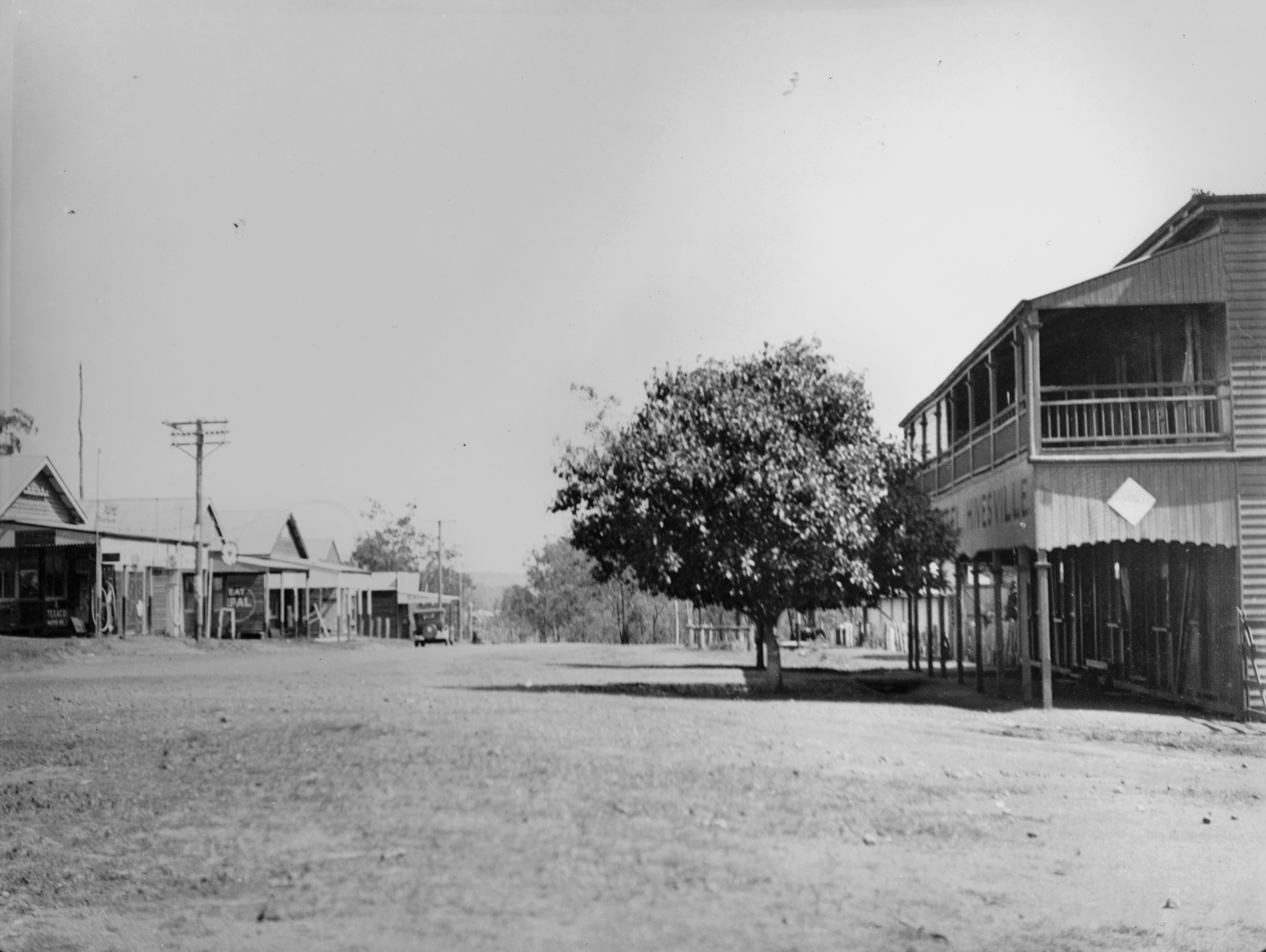
- Street view in Hivesville, circa 1930

- Interactive map of Hivesville
- Coordinates: 26.1772°S 151.6916°E
- Country: Australia
- State: Queensland
- LGA: South Burnett Region
- Location: 11.0 km (6.8 mi) E of Proston; 32.3 km (20.1 mi) WNW of Murgon; 54.6 km (33.9 mi) NNW of Kingaroy; 125 km (78 mi) W of Gympie; 270 km (170 mi) NW of Brisbane

Government
  - State electorate: Nanango
  - Federal division: Flynn

Area
  - Total: 14.3 km^{2} (5.5 sq mi)

Population
  - Total: 173 (2021 census)
  - Density: 12.10/km^{2} (31.33/sq mi)
- Time zone: UTC+10:00 (AEST)
- Postcode: 4612
Localities around Hivesville
Kinleymore	Stonelands	Stonelands
Kinleymore	Hivesville	Kawl Kawl
Kinleymore	Mount McEuen	Kawl Kawl

Hivesville is a rural town and locality in the South Burnett Region, Queensland, Australia. In the 2021 census, the locality of Hivesville had a population of 173 people.

== Geography ==
The town is located on the Proston-Wondai road, 277 kilometres (172 mi) north west of the state capital, Brisbane.

== History ==
Hivesville, originally referred to informally as Proston (a term inclusive of the whole district West of Mondure at the time, as well as the first buildings which became the town), was allocated the official name of Jaumbill by the Railways Department. Jaumbill is believed to be an Aboriginal word in the Waka language meaning yam. On the request of James Braidwood Edwards, the Member of the Queensland Legislative Assembly for Nanango, the town was named Hivesville, after George Hives, a pioneer settler. On 2 March 1923, the Queensland Railways Department named the railway station Hivesville.

The Hives family owned substantial property around the site of the town (centred on Sunday Creek Station) from the 1890s. The Sunday Creek station homestead, known at the time as 'Sandy House', served as a much valued local source of provisions and the distribution of mail in the earliest days of closer settlement when pioneering farmers first came to the district.

Hivesville Post Office opened by December 1923 and closed in 1991. The town is now serviced by a Community Post Office located at the service station.

The town was for many years the predominant business centre for the district west of Wondai and had developed into a vibrant community hub before the nearby town of Proston was founded. There is evidence the first store was erected in 1910 or 1911 (proprietor Mr. S.S. Fenwick), some years before it was ever known as Hivesville or Jaumbil. In these early years the town was referred to by locals as Proston and remained so until the railway department imposed the name of Jaumbill The first hotel, known as the Proston Hotel, was established in 1911, and later burned down in November 1935. The new hotel was still known as the Proston Hotel when it opened in 1937 and was not renamed the Hivesville Hotel until 1953. The original hotel narrowly escapted destruction by a previous fire in 1924 but was saved in the middle of the night by the gallant efforts of guests staying there.

Mail was received via 'Sandy House', the residence of the Hives family at nearby Sunday Creek Station in these early years. Indeed, until 1930, Hivesville eclipsed Proston in size and importance. In these early years Hivesville boasted a general store, bakery, butcher, garage with six bowsers, blacksmith, post office, school, hotel, two cafes, two bank branches, the Empire theatre cinema, railway station and various receiving depots. When the Proston railway line arrived some fourteen years after the first town buildings had been established, the name of the town was changed from Jaumbill to Hivesville (in 1923) and was served by the Hivesville railway station (26.1774°S 151.6930°E). Rail sidings were established at nearby Kawl Kawl and Kinleymore. The railway line closed in 1993.

A large public hall was constructed, along with QCWA rest rooms, Church of England and Lutheran church. Residents of the following nearby farming localities regarded Hivesville as their primary town of business from the time of first settlement into the 1960s, although the town originally serviced a much wider area - Abbeywood, Stalworth, Speedwell, Kinleymore, Stonelands, and Keysland. When the nearby town of Proston overtook Hivesville as the major centre of the district in the 1930s, Hivesville entered a long period of slow decline until by the early 1970s it resembled what it is today.

The first school in the immediate vicinity of what was later called Hivesville, was the short-lived Proston Provisional School which operated from 1917-1918. This was a tent school which moved with the railway construction camps as the branch line from Murgon to Proston was being developed.

The Hivesville State School opened in 1924 and closed in 1968. The school's first teacher, Alexander Wilson served in that position until July 1937. The school was in Hivesville Road (26.1758°S 151.6964°E). Nearby schools were also established at Kinleymore (1913-1969), Speedwell (1912-1963), Stonelands (1932-1967), Keysland (1915–1974) and Abbeywood (1914-1969). There was no school at Stalworth; however that district became known for a local hall where dances and social functions were held and there was also a butter factory there for a short time as well.

Some of the original settlers in the district included John and Percy Slinger, George Perkins, W.Perkins, C.Perkins, H.Perkins, R.Potter, E.Hird, A.Taylor, George Hatchett, W.T.B.Hatchett, Reuben (John) Bull, E.Dowell, H.Olsen, S.Porter, A.Chesterton, A.Harper, C.Harper, M.Comerford, J.Walton, M.McGovern, R.Glanville, E.Cridland, H.Nairne, W.Waters, E.Murgatroyd, S.Sunderland, A.Ley, J.Kinnear, D.Morey, W.Welch, E.York, C.Rees, R.Bracken, J.Donkersley, J.Wardill, J.Grace, H.Holdsworth, H, Crick. P.Henry, T.Marriott, S.Shaw, and Harry Flynn. These first settlers, took up uncleared selections of virgin bush, with most between 300 and 350 acres in size. The price was seventeen shillings and sixpence an acre, payable to the Queensland Lands Department over thirty-three years in annual installments, at an interest rate of three percent. Initially the bush and scrub was cleared and then corn and Rhodes grass planted. Income was generated through dairying, with the cream being sent by rail to Maryborough in the earliest years and later to Murgon. Excess milk was fed to pigs which generated further income and calves from the cows were also sold. Corn was the most regular crop. The system was viable, but only just, and there were many hard years.

The northwestern part of the district, which became known as Abbeywood, Speedwell and Stalworth, was largely settled by English immigrants who had travelled to Australia on the ship "Oswestry Grange". This ship made several journeys to Queensland between 1905 and 1912. These immigrants formed a progress association in order to agitate authorities for improvements such as roads, railway and schools. As the area had no name, it was referred to for a time as the Oswestry Grange settlement and later simply, the Overseas settlement, due to the selections being reserved for English settlers. Throughout the Hivesville area, sub-district locality place names were gradually adopted, usually when a school, hall, rail siding or other building was initiated.

Early businesses in Hivesville were operated by Arthur Johnson, Messrs. Thorne and Walker, Mrs. Jennings, S.Fuller, Messrs. Levitt and Smith, Miss Schultz and J.Webb.

Mary Vaughan (nee Johnson), daughter of Arthur Johnson, operated a general store in the town for many years until well into old age.

The Hivesville Hall opened in October 1924. It was at 3 Main Street (26.1760°S 151.6904°E). It was closed and sold by South Burnett Regional Council in 2017.

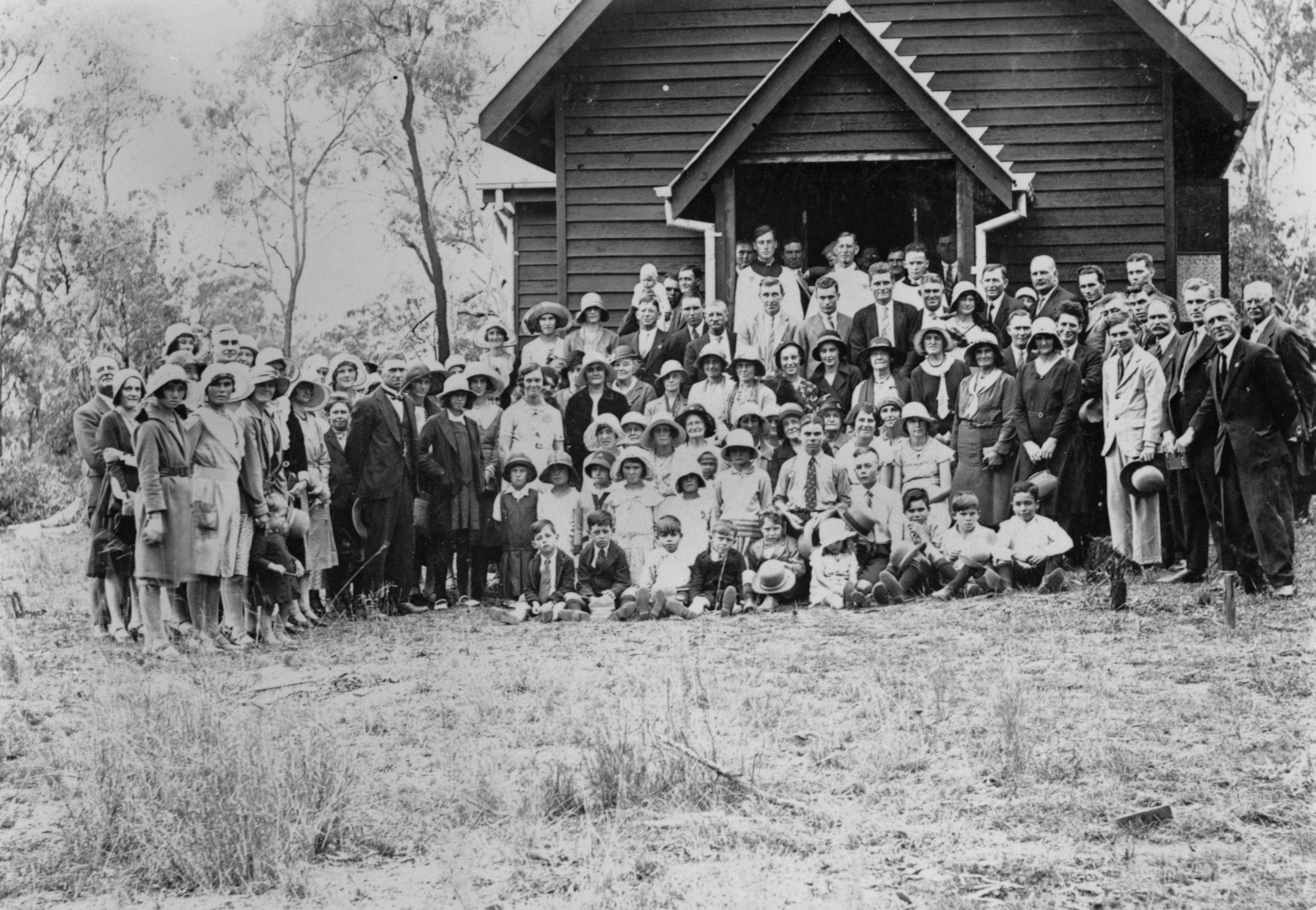
Opening of the Holy Spirit Church of England, 1932

The Anglican Church of the Holy Spirit opened on 15 May 1932. It was the first church in Hivesville and was erected by volunteer labour to the design of architect Mr E. Bird. Its closure on 3 June 2005 was approved by Assistant Bishop Rob Nolan. The Hivesville Hall fell into disuse and was handed over to the Wondai and later South Burnett Regional Council, who sold the building into private ownership in 2017.

St Mark's Lutheran Church opened in the early 1960s.

Telephone services first became available in the district in 1924 when the Hivesville exchange was opened.

Mr. Arthur Johnson, businessman of Hivesville, also operated a travelling cinema for many years across a wide area of Queensland. There is evidence he showed pictures in the Hivesville Hall as early as 1929. The Empire Theatre was built at a later date to provide for cinema entertainment in the township.

== Demographics ==
In the 2006 census, the locality of Hivesville and the surrounding area had a population of 310 people.

In the 2016 census, the locality of Hivesville had a population of 169 people.

In the 2021 census, the locality of Hivesville had a population of 173 people.

== Education ==
There are no schools in Hivesville. The nearest government primary school is Proston State School in Proston to the west. The nearest government secondary schools are Proston State School (to Year 10) in Proston and Murgon State High School (to Year 12) in Murgon to the east.

== Facilities ==
Facilities in the town include a church, old pub, convenience store with petrol, diesel and lpg gas, plus a sports oval.

The Hivesville branch of the Queensland Country Women's Association meets at 12 Main Street.

St Mark's Lutheran Church is at 11-13 Edward Street (26.1765°S 151.6934°E).

Hivesville (War) Memorial Park was dedicated in 2006 following construction and design by members of the local community.
