= MP Creek, Queensland =

MP Creek
- Suburb
- Interactive map of MP Creek
- Coordinates: 26.2858°S 151.7275°E
- Country: Australia
- State: Queensland
- LGA: South Burnett Region
- Location: 29.2 km (18.1 mi) SW of Murgon; 38.3 km (23.8 mi) NNW of Kingaroy; 121 km (75 mi) W of Gympie; 259 km (161 mi) NW of Brisbane

Government
  - State electorate: Nanango
  - Federal division: Flynn

Area
  - Total: 40.3 km^{2} (15.6 sq mi)

Population
  - Total: 29 (2021 census)
  - Density: 0.720/km^{2} (1.86/sq mi)
- Time zone: UTC+10:00 (AEST)
- Postcode: 4606
Suburbs around MP Creek
Melrose	Mount McEuen	Fairdale
Melrose	MP Creek	Greenview
Wilkesdale	Cushnie	Cushnie

MP Creek is a rural locality in the South Burnett Region, Queensland, Australia. In the 2021 census, MP Creek had a population of 29 people.

== Geography ==
MP Creek Road enters the locality from the south-east (Cushnie) and exits to the west (Melrose).

There are two sections of Cushnie State Forest in the north-west and centre of the locality. Apart from these protected areas, the land use is mostly grazing on native vegetation with some crop growing (mostly in the east and south-east of the locality).

== History ==
The locality name was previously written as "Mp Creek" until 4 July 2024 when it was officially changed to "MP Creek". It also is written as "M.P. Creek".

Circa 1910, "thousands of acres" of Burrandowan pastoral station were resumed by the Queensland Government for closer settlement; MP Creek was part of that resumption.

== Demographics ==
In the 2016 census, MP Creek had a population of 38 people.

In the 2021 census, MP Creek had a population of 29 people.

== Education ==
There are no schools in MP Creek. The nearest government primary schools are Tingoora State School in Tingoora to the south-east and Wheatlands State School in Wheatlands to the north-east. The nearest government secondary schools are Wondai State School (to Year 9) in Wondai to the east, Murgon State High School (to Year 12) in Murgon to the north-east and Proston State School (to Year 10) in Proston to the north-west.
