= Wilkesdale, Queensland =

Wilkesdale
- Suburb
- Interactive map of Wilkesdale
- Coordinates: 26.3483°S 151.6636°E
- Country: Australia
- State: Queensland
- LGA: South Burnett Region
- Location: 37.4 km (23.2 mi) NW of Kingaroy; 39.1 km (24.3 mi) SW of Murgon; 191 km (119 mi) N of Toowoomba; 250 km (160 mi) NW of Brisbane

Government
  - State electorate: Nanango
  - Federal division: Flynn

Area
  - Total: 58.2 km^{2} (22.5 sq mi)

Population
  - Total: 101 (2021 census)
  - Density: 1.735/km^{2} (4.495/sq mi)
- Time zone: UTC+10:00 (AEST)
- Postcode: 4608
Suburbs around Wilkesdale
Melrose	Melrose	MP Creek
Ballogie	Wilkesdale	Cushnie
Gordonbrook	Wooroolin	Wooroolin

Wilkesdale is a rural locality in the South Burnett Region, Queensland, Australia. In the 2021 census, Wilkesdale had a population of 101 people.

== Geography ==
The Chinchilla Wondai Road (State Route 82) runs through from west to east.

== Demographics ==
In the 2016 census, Wilkesdale had a population of 119 people.

In the 2021 census, Wilkesdale had a population of 101 people.

== Education ==
There are no schools in Wilkesdale. The nearest government primary school is Tingoora State School in Tingoora to the east. The nearest government secondary schools are:

- Proston State School (to Year 10) in Proston to the north
- Murgon State High School (to Year 12) in Murgon to the north-east
- Wondai State School (to Year 9) in Wondai to the east
- Kingaroy State High School (to Year 12) in Kingaroy to the south-east
