= Ballogie, Queensland =

Ballogie
- Suburb
- Interactive map of Ballogie
- Coordinates: 26.3372°S 151.5386°E
- Country: Australia
- State: Queensland
- LGA: South Burnett Region
- Location: 48.1 km (29.9 mi) NW of Kingaroy; 147 km (91 mi) W of Gympie; 270 km (170 mi) NW of Brisbane

Government
  - State electorate: Nanango
  - Federal division: Flynn

Area
  - Total: 130.9 km^{2} (50.5 sq mi)

Population
  - Total: 276 (2021 census)
  - Density: 2.108/km^{2} (5.461/sq mi)
- Time zone: UTC+10:00 (AEST)
- Postcode: 4610
Suburbs around Ballogie
Coverty	Melrose	Melrose
Durong	Ballogie	Wilkesdale
Durong	Chahpingah	Dangore

Ballogie is a rural locality in the South Burnett Region, Queensland, Australia. In the 2021 census, Ballogie had a population of 276 people.

== Geography ==
The Chinchilla Wondai Road passes east to west through the locality.

The land is undulating ranging from 370 to 450 metres (1,210 to 1,480 ft). The valleys have creeks running through them and are partially cleared while the higher areas are less developed.

The predominant land use is grazing on native vegetation.

== History ==
In September 2012, a 2.9 magnitude earthquake occurred near Ballogie. No damage was reported.

== Demographics ==
In the 2016 census, Ballogie had a population of 276 people.

In the 2021 census, Ballogie had a population of 276 people.

== Education ==
There are no schools in Ballogie. The nearest government primary schools are Durong South State School in neighbouring Durong to the west, Proston State School in Proston to the enorth-east, and Tingoora State School in Tingoora to the east. The nearest government secondary schools are Proston State School (to Year 10), Wondai State School (to Year 10) in Wondai to the east, and Kingaroy State High School (to Year 12) in Kingaroy to the south-east.

== Amenities ==
The Ballogie branch of the Queensland Country Women's Association meet at Seiler Road.

== Attractions ==
In June 2025, the South Burnett Regional Council approved a proposal to construct a motorsport facility in Lewis Duff Road (approx 26.3342°S 151.4579°E). The proposal includes two oval speedway tracks and a staight dirt drags track, with provision for spectator parking, caretaker’s accommodation, and a tourist park. The proposal had received both support and criticism from local residents and council staff.
