= Leafdale =

- Suburb
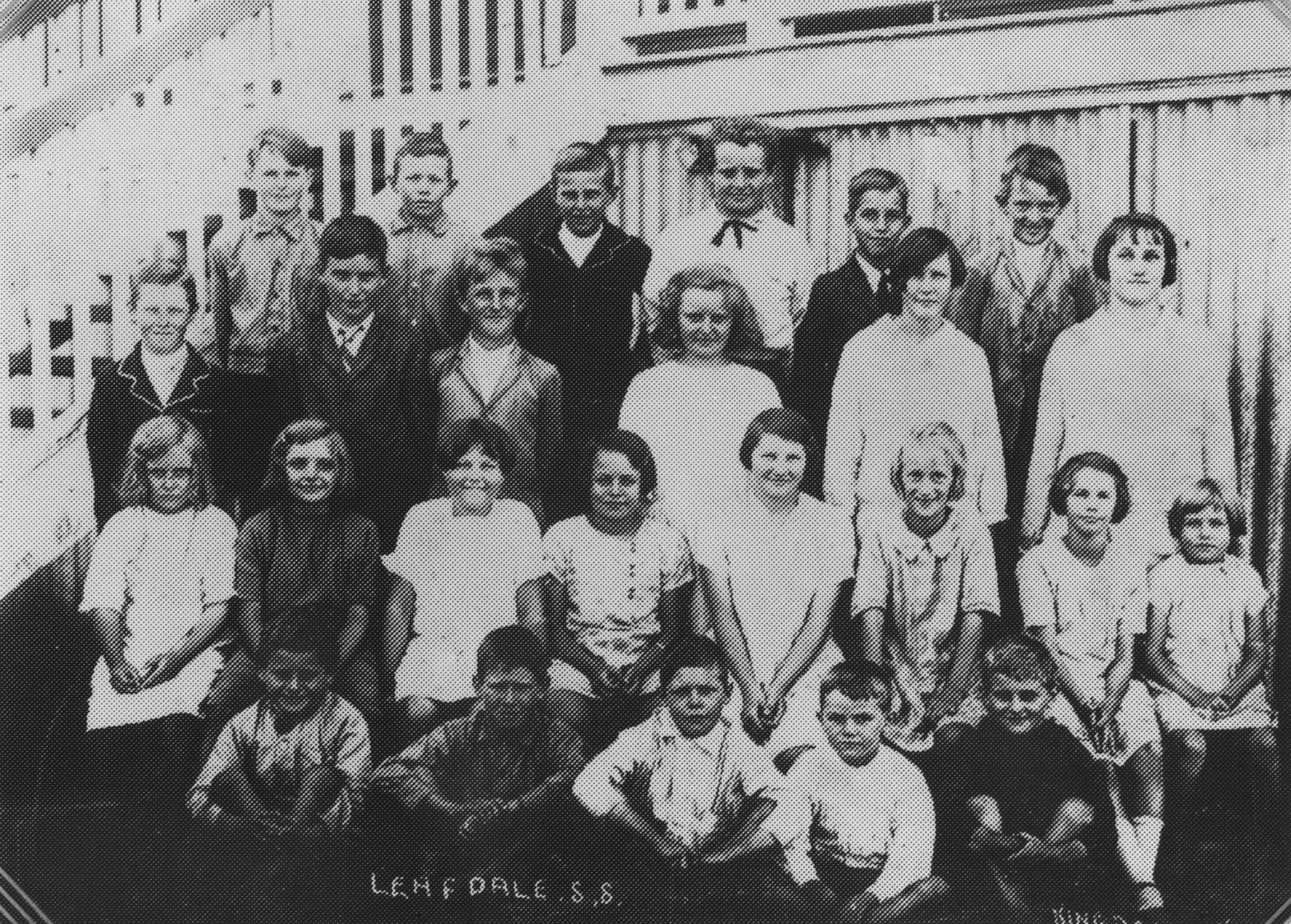
- Leafdale State School students, circa 1928

- Interactive map of Leafdale
- Coordinates: 26.2386°S 151.7733°E
- Country: Australia
- State: Queensland
- LGA: South Burnett Region
- Location: 20.3 km (12.6 mi) W of Murgon; 41.9 km (26.0 mi) N of Kingaroy; 117 km (73 mi) W of Gympie; 270 km (170 mi) NW of Brisbane

Government
  - State electorate: Nanango
  - Federal division: Flynn

Area
  - Total: 15.3 km^{2} (5.9 sq mi)

Population
  - Total: 12 (2021 census)
  - Density: 0.78/km^{2} (2.03/sq mi)
- Time zone: UTC+10:00 (AEST)
- Postcode: 4606
Suburbs around Leafdale
Keysland	Mondure	Silverleaf
Mount McEuen	Leafdale	Chelmsford
Fairdale	Fairdale	Chelmsford

Leafdale is a rural locality in the South Burnett Region, Queensland, Australia. In the 2021 census, Leafdale had a population of 12 people.

== History ==
Leafdale State School opened on 20 August 1924 in the relocated Mondure North school building. It closed on 31 March 1933. It was at 32 Fairdale Road (corner of McEuen Road, 26.2486°S 151.7693°E).

Leafdale Methodist Church was built in 1931 from timber. It was officially opened on Saturday 29 August 1931 by the Reverend Richard Pollard Pope, President of the Methodist Conference. The church is no longer extant. It was at 1 Mount McEuen Road (26.248276°S 151.77°E).

== Demographics ==
In the 2016 census, Leafdale had a population of 28 people.

In the 2021 census, Leafdale had a population of 12 people.

== Education ==
There are no schools in Leafdale. The nearest government primary school is Wheatlands State School in neighbouring Wheatlands to the north-east. The nearest government secondary schools are Wondai State School (to Year 10) in Wondai to the south-east, Proston State School (to Year 10) in Proston to the west, and Murgon State High School (to Year 12) in Murgon to the east.
