= Fairdale, Queensland =

Fairdale
- Suburb
- Interactive map of Fairdale
- Coordinates: 26.2677°S 151.7705°E
- Country: Australia
- State: Queensland
- LGA: South Burnett Region
- Location: 27.2 km (16.9 mi) W of Murgon; 40.6 km (25.2 mi) N of Kingaroy; 119 km (74 mi) W of Gympie; 254 km (158 mi) NW of Brisbane

Government
  - State electorate: Nanango
  - Federal division: Flynn

Area
  - Total: 11.6 km^{2} (4.5 sq mi)

Population
  - Total: 48 (2021 census)
  - Density: 4.14/km^{2} (10.72/sq mi)
- Time zone: UTC+10:00 (AEST)
- Postcode: 4606
Suburbs around Fairdale
| Mount McEuen | Leafdale | Chelmsford |
| MP Creek | Fairdale | Chelmsford |
| MP Creek | Greenview | Greenview |

Fairdale is a rural locality in the South Burnett Region, Queensland, Australia. In the 2021 census, Fairdale had a population of 48 people.

== Geography ==
The land use is predominantly crop growing in the north of the locality and grazing on native vegetation in the south of the locality.

== History ==
Mondure Central State School opened on 26 September 1910. It was on the northern side of Red Hill Road (26.27795°S 151.77512°E). On 13 October 1932, it was relocated to the west of the junction of Fairdale Road (also known as Mondure Cushnie Road) and Springs Road (26.2584°S 151.7673°E) and renamed Fairdale State School. It closed in 1972.

== Demographics ==
In the 2016 census, Fairdale had a population of 35 people.

In the 2021 census, Fairdale had a population of 48 people.

== Education ==
There are no schools in Fairdale. The nearest government primary schools are Wheatlands State School in Wheatlands to the north-east and Tingoora State School in Tingoora to the south-east. The nearest government secondary schools are Wondai State School (to Year 9) in Wondai to the south-east and Murgon State High School (to Year 12) in Murgon to the east.
