= Mount McEuen, Queensland =

Mount McEuen
- Suburb
- Interactive map of Mount McEuen
- Coordinates: 26.235°S 151.719°E
- Country: Australia
- State: Queensland
- LGA: South Burnett Region
- Location: 28.5 km (17.7 mi) E of Murgon; 45.8 km (28.5 mi) N of Kingaroy; 120 km (75 mi) W of Gympie; 259 km (161 mi) NW of Brisbane

Government
  - State electorate: Nanango
  - Federal division: Flynn

Area
  - Total: 27.6 km^{2} (10.7 sq mi)

Population
  - Total: 34 (2021 census)
  - Density: 1.232/km^{2} (3.19/sq mi)
- Time zone: UTC+10:00 (AEST)
- Postcode: 4606
Suburbs around Mount McEuen
Kinleymore	Hivesville; Kawl Kawl	Keysland
Melrose	Mount McEuen	Leafdale
Melrose	MP Creek	Fairdale

Mount McEuen is a rural locality in the South Burnett Region, Queensland, Australia. In the 2021 census, Mount McEuen had a population of 34 people.

== Geography ==
Mount McEuen is a mountain in the south-east of the locality (26.2482°S 151.7417°E), rising to 525 metres (1,722 ft) above sea level. It rises to a prominent pointed peak in a shape that is volcanic in origin, making it a significant local landmark. It was used as a vantage point by surveyors in the earliest days of preparing subdivisions for closer settlement and farming.

The Wondai Proston Road forms part of the north-eastern boundary of the locality.

The Mondure State Forest is in the west of the locality. Apart from the protected area, the land use is predominantly grazing on native vegetation with some crop growing.

== Demographics ==
In the 2016 census, Mount McEuen had a population of 36 people.

In the 2021 census, Mount McEuen had a population of 34 people.

== Education ==
There are no schools in the locality. The nearest government primary schools are Proston State School in Proston to the north-west and Wheatlands State School in Wheatlands to the east. The nearest government secondary schools are Proston State School (to Year 10), Wondai State School (to Year 9) in Wondai to the south-east, and Murgon State High School (to Year 12) in Murgon to the east. There is also a Catholic primary school in Murgon.
