= Melrose, Queensland =

Melrose
- Suburb
- Interactive map of Melrose
- Coordinates: 26.2608°S 151.6261°E
- Country: Australia
- State: Queensland
- LGA: South Burnett Region
- Location: 48.9 km (30.4 mi) W of Murgon; 54.9 km (34.1 mi) NNW of Kingaroy; 141 km (88 mi) W of Gympie; 300 km (190 mi) NW of Brisbane

Government
  - State electorate: Nanango
  - Federal division: Flynn

Area
  - Total: 165.9 km^{2} (64.1 sq mi)

Population
  - Total: 39 (2021 census)
  - Density: 0.2351/km^{2} (0.609/sq mi)
- Time zone: UTC+10:00 (AEST)
- Postcode: 4613
Suburbs around Melrose
| Proston | Kinleymore | Mount McEuen |
| Okeden | Melrose | MP Creek |
| Coverty | Ballogie; Wilkesdale | Cushnie |

Melrose is a rural locality in the South Burnett Region, Queensland, Australia. In the 2021 census, Melrose had a population of 39 people.

== Geography ==
The Cushnie State Forest is in the north-east of the locality. Apart from this protected area, the predominant land use is grazing on native vegetation.

== Demographics ==
In the 2016 census, Melrose had "no people or a very low population".

In the 2021 census, Melrose had a population of 39 people.

== Education ==
There are no schools in Melrose. The nearest government primary schools are Proston State School in neighbouring Proston to the north-west and Tingoora State School in Tingoora to the south-east. The nearest government secondary schools are Proston State School (to Year 10), Wondai State School (to Year 9) in Wondai to the east, Murgon State High School (to Year 12) to Murgon to the east, and Kingaroy State High School (to Year 12) in Kingaroy to the south-east. However, for students living in the south-west of Melrose may be too distant for a daily commute to a school providing education to Year 12; the alternatives are distance education and boarding school.
