= Cushnie, Queensland =

Cushnie
- Suburb
- Interactive map of Cushnie
- Coordinates: 26.3413°S 151.7427°E
- Country: Australia
- State: Queensland
- LGA: South Burnett Region
- Location: 16.8 km (10.4 mi) WSW of Wondai; 29.9 km (18.6 mi) NW of Kingaroy; 31.7 km (19.7 mi) SW of Murgon; 124 km (77 mi) WSW of Gympie; 258 km (160 mi) NW of Brisbane

Government
  - State electorate: Nanango
  - Federal division: Flynn

Area
  - Total: 78.2 km^{2} (30.2 sq mi)

Population
  - Total: 145 (2021 census)
  - Density: 1.854/km^{2} (4.802/sq mi)
- Time zone: UTC+10:00 (AEST)
- Postcode: 4608
Suburbs around Cushnie
Melrose	MP Creek	Greenview
Wilkesdale	Cushnie	Tingoora
Wooroolin	Wooroolin	Wooroolin

Cushnie is a rural locality in the South Burnett Region, Queensland, Australia. In the 2021 census, Cushnie had a population of 145 people.

== Geography ==
The Chinchilla Wondai Road (State Route 82) passes through from west to east.

The neighbourhood of Home Creek is within the locality at 26.3660°S 51.7704°E.

== History ==
Cushnie is a surname of Scottish origin, believed to be derived from the parish of Leochel-Cushnie. The origin of the word "Cushnie" is uncertain.

Home Creek Provisional School opened on 29 January 1906. On 1 January 1909, it became Home Creek State School. It closed on 6 February 1949. The school was located on the south-western corner of the intersection of Chinchilla Wondai Road and Denmark/Harms Road (26.3667°S 151.7689°E). The watercourse Home Creek flows through the area and is presumably the origin of the name.

Cushnie State School opened on 14 November 1918 with 18 students. The first head teacher was Adolph Honke. There was an outbreak of diphtheria at the school in December 1927. There were about 50 students at the school in 1932 with one teacher, Mr Lehman. The school closed in 1972 due to falling student numbers. The school was at 790 Cushnie Road (corner of Reinkes Road, 26.32962°S 151.74213°E).

== Demographics ==
In the 2016 census, Cushnie had a population of 135 people.

In the 2021 census, Cushnie had a population of 145 people.

== Education ==
There are no schools in Cushnie. The nearest government primary school is Tingoora State School in neighbouring Tingoora to the east. The nearest government secondary schools are Wondai State School (to Year 10) in Wondai to the east, Murgon State High School (to Year 12) in Murgon to the north-east, and Kingaroy State High School (to Year 12) in Kingaroy to the south-east.
