= Chelmsford, Queensland =

Chelmsford
- Suburb
- Interactive map of Chelmsford
- Coordinates: 26.2636°S 151.8261°E
- Country: Australia
- State: Queensland
- LGA: South Burnett Region
- Location: 16.2 km (10.1 mi) W of Murgon; 36.9 km (22.9 mi) N of Kingaroy; 108 km (67 mi) W of Gympie; 190 km (120 mi) N of Toowoomba; 283 km (176 mi) NNW of Brisbane

Government
  - State electorate: Nanango
  - Federal division: Flynn

Area
  - Total: 38.4 km^{2} (14.8 sq mi)

Population
  - Total: 100 (2021 census)
  - Density: 2.6/km^{2} (7/sq mi)
- Time zone: UTC+10:00 (AEST)
- Postcode: 4606
Suburbs around Chelmsford
Leafdale	Silverleaf	Wheatlands
Fairdale	Chelmsford	Wondai
Greenview	Greenview	Wondai

Chelmsford is a rural locality in the South Burnett Region, Queensland, Australia. In the 2021 census, Chelmsford had a population of 100 people.

== History ==
Chelmsford State School opened on 23 August 1910. It closed circa 1972. The school was located on the south-east corner of the intersection of Tingoora Chelmsford Road and Springs Road / Old Chemsford Road (26.2686°S 151.8108°E).

== Demographics ==
In the 2016 census Chelmsford had a population of 124 people.

In the 2021 census, Chelmsford had a population of 100 people.

== Education ==
There are no schools in Chelmsford. The nearest government primary schools are Wheatlands State School in neighbouring Wheatlands to the north, Wondai State School in neighbouring Wondai to the south-east, and Tingoora State School in Tingoora to the south. The nearest government secondary schools are Wondai State School (to Year 9) and Murgon State High School (to Year 12) in Murgon to the north-east.
