= Wigton, Queensland =

Wigton
- Suburb
- Interactive map of Wigton
- Coordinates: 25.9733°S 151.5844°E
- Country: Australia
- State: Queensland
- LGA: South Burnett Region
- Location: 46.1 km (28.6 mi) S of Gayndah; 81.7 km (50.8 mi) NNW of Kingaroy; 152 km (94 mi) WNW of Gympie; 304 km (189 mi) NW of Brisbane

Government
  - State electorate: Nanango
  - Federal division: Flynn

Area
  - Total: 391.3 km^{2} (151.1 sq mi)

Population
  - Total: 5 (2021 census)
  - Density: 0.0128/km^{2} (0.033/sq mi)
- Time zone: UTC+10:00 (AEST)
- Postcode: 4612
Suburbs around Wigton
Old Cooranga; Pile Gully	Aranbanga	Wahoon
Toondahra	Wigton	Stonelands
Boondooma; Speedwell	Stalworth	Abbeywood

Wigton is a rural locality in the South Burnett Region, Queensland, Australia. In the 2021 census, Wigton had a population of 5 people.

== Geography ==
Wigton Road enters the locality from the north (Aranbanga) and becomes Gaydnah Hivesville Road. It continues south through the locality and exits to the south-east (Abbeywood).

Wigton State Forest is in the south-west of the locality and Woroon State Forest 2 is in the south-east of the locality. Apart from these protected areas, the land use is predominantly grazing on native vegetation.

== Demographics ==
In the 2016 census, Wigton had a population of 4 people.

In the 2021 census, Wigton had a population of 5 people.

== Education ==
There are no schools in Wigton. The nearest government primary schools are Proston State School in Proston to the south, Gayndah State School in Gayndah to the north, and Cloyna State School in Cloyna to the south-east. The nearest government secondary schools are Proston State School (to Year 10) and Burnett State College (to Year 12) in Gayndah. However, Gayndah may be too distant for students in the south-west of the locality to attend; the alternatives are distance education and boarding school.
