= Wahoon, Queensland =

Wahoon
- Suburb
- Interactive map of Wahoon
- Coordinates: 25.8955°S 151.7302°E
- Country: Australia
- State: Queensland
- LGA: North Burnett Region
- Location: 45.1 km (28.0 mi) S of Gayndah; 137 km (85 mi) NW of Gympie; 192 km (119 mi) SW of Bundaberg; 312 km (194 mi) NNW of Brisbane

Government
  - State electorate: Callide
  - Federal division: Flynn

Area
  - Total: 90.4 km^{2} (34.9 sq mi)

Population
  - Total: 0 (2021 census)
  - Density: 0.000/km^{2} (0.000/sq mi)
- Time zone: UTC+10:00 (AEST)
- Postcode: 4625
Suburbs around Wahoon
Aranbanga	Aranbanga	Booubyjan
Wigton	Wahoon	Booubyjan
Wigton	Stonelands	Booubyjan

Wahoon is a rural locality in the North Burnett Region, Queensland, Australia. In the 2021 census, Wahoon had "no people or a very low population".

== Geography ==
Barambah Creek enters the locality from the south-east (Stonelands / Booubyjan) and forms the eastern boundary of the locality, exiting to the north-east (Aranbanga / Booubyjan). It becomes a tributary of the Burnett River.

The Beninbi National Park is in the centre and north-east of the locality. Apart from this protected area, the predominant land use is grazing on native vegetation.

== Demographics ==
In the 2016 census, Wahoon had "no people or a very low population".

In the 2021 census, Wahoon had "no people or a very low population".

== Education ==
There are no schools in Wahoon. The nearest government primary schools are Gayndah State School in Gayndah to the north-west and Cloyna State School in Cloyna to the south-east. The nearest government secondary schools are Proston State School (to Year 10) in Proston to the south and Burnett State College in Gayndah.
