= Shepherd Memorial Church of St Peter, Proston =

Shepherd Memorial Church of St Peter
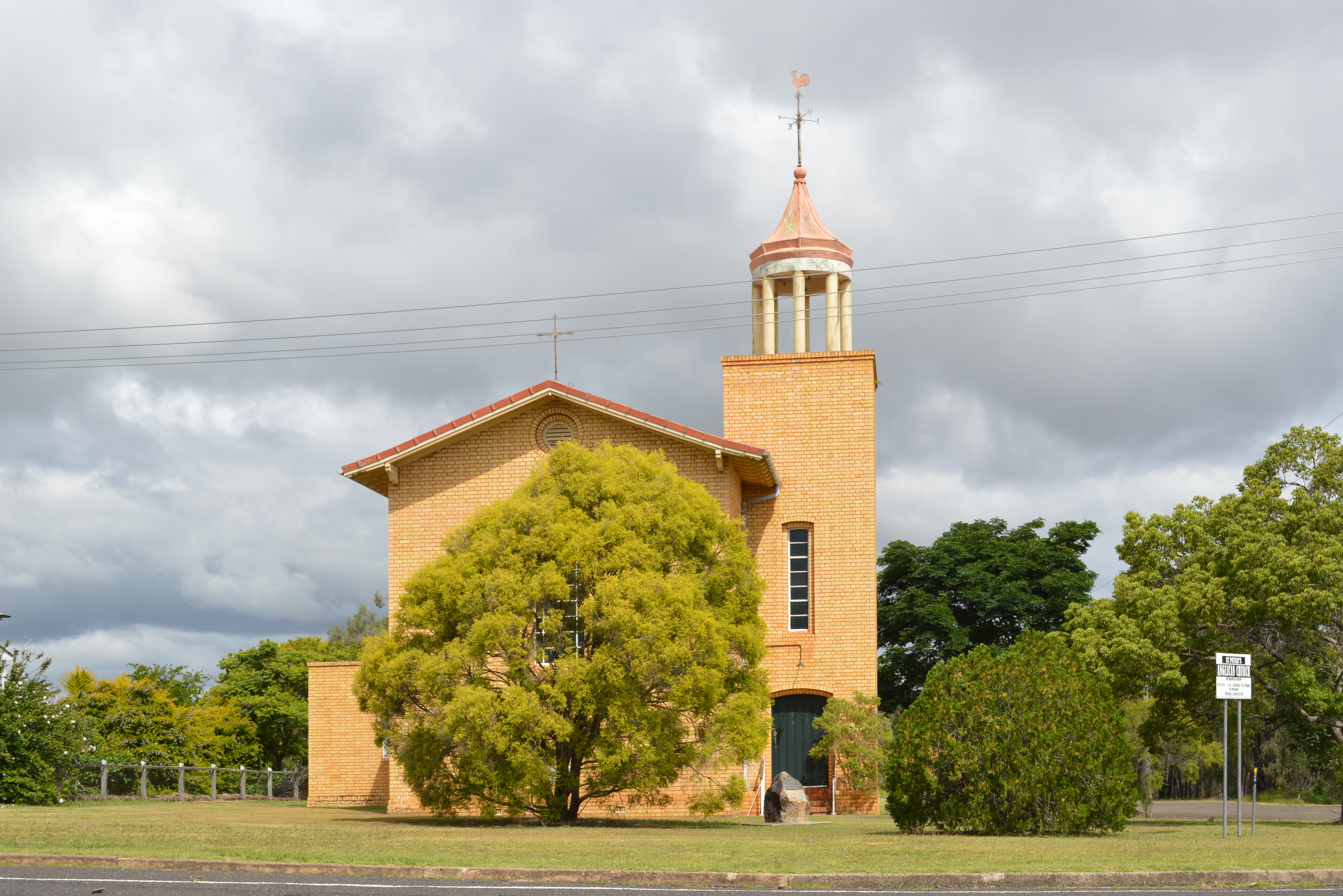
- Shepherd Memorial Church of St Peter, 2017

- Location within Queensland Location within Australia
- 26.1607°S 151.6011°E
- Location: Corner of Drake Street and Wondai Road, Proston, South Burnett Region, Queensland, Australia

Site notes
- Architect: Fowell, McConnel and Mansfield

Queensland Heritage Register
- Official name: Shepherd Memorial Church of St Peter
- Type: state heritage (built)
- Designated: 9 November 2012
- Reference no.: 602813
- Significant period: 1939–
- Builders: Lesleigh George Windmell Smith

Shepherd Memorial Church of St Peter is a heritage-listed Anglican church at the corner of Drake Street and Wondai Road, Proston, South Burnett Region, Queensland, Australia. It was designed by Fowell, McConnel and Mansfield and built from 1937 to 1939 by Lesleigh George Windmell Smith. It was added to the Queensland Heritage Register on 9 November 2012.

== History ==
The Shepherd Memorial Church of St Peter (St Peter's Church), on the corner of Drake Street and Wondai Road, Proston was designed by architects, Fowell, McConnel and Mansfield, supervised by Brisbane architects Lucas and Cummings, and built between December 1937 and July 1939 by LGW Smith, using local bricks. This Scandinavian-influenced church was funded by a bequest from grazier Charles Shepherd of "Aston" near Proston.

The town of Proston is sited on land that was originally part of the pastoral lease Wigton, which dated from 1850. In 1910 the Queensland Government opened the land for closer settlement and offered agricultural blocks by ballot. Those who were successful and settled on the land struggled against prickly pear, little reliable water and small returns.

Growth of the township of Proston was therefore slow until a branch railway line from Murgon opened in 1923 facilitating growth. A public hall, school, general store, bulk store, hotel, shop and banks were erected thereafter. Eradication of prickly pear in the late 1920s and the opening of a butter factory by the South Burnett Dairy Cooperative in June 1934 and its pre-war expansion again boosted Proston's development. As part of the Wide Bay district, Proston dairy farmers contributed to the district's standing as the second largest milk producer in Queensland during the interwar period. By 1939 Proston possessed many services including a railway station complex with cattle yards, police station, postal department and a school with 102 pupils. A small private hospital, the Boondooma Private Hospital, operated in the region from 1934 to 1940. Numerous small businesses had been established, such as garages, billiard rooms, hairdressers, bakers, plumbers, a restaurant, the Proston Electric Light Company and the CG Baldwin and Sons' sawmill. A telephone service had been installed and main roads construction was progressing.

It was during this period of Proston's growth (in 1934) that survey for subdivision of the land on which the Shepherd Memorial Church of St Peter's is sited took place. The foundation stone of the St Peter's Church was laid by the Archbishop of Brisbane, Dr William Wand, on 30 May 1937. Transfer by Deed of Grant of allotments 1, 17 and 18 to the Corporation of the Synod of the Diocese of Brisbane occurred in October 1938. In the meantime, the church was constructed on allotment 1. Its consecration by the Archbishop of Brisbane took place on 3 July 1938.

Funding for the church was provided by the will of Charles Shepherd, who died at the Boondooma Private Hospital in Proston on 7 June 1935, aged 70 years. Leaving neither wife nor offspring, he appointed his bank manager as his executor when making his will two months prior to his death. Charles Shepherd's will made two bequests of £50 each to his doctor and the matron of the Boondooma Private Hospital. The remainder of his estate, which totalled £8,687 4s 4d was left to the Corporation of the Synod of the Diocese of Brisbane of the Branch of the Church of England in Queensland; to be held in trust for the Proston and Wondai District (at the time in Kingaroy parish) to be applied in or towards such religious, charitable or educational purposes in the district as the Corporation should think fit. Furthermore, he directed that £3,000 must be used for the erection and furnishing of a church in Proston by the Church of England. Later, his body was exhumed from the Proston Cemetery and placed under St Peter's Church in a mortuary chamber shown on the architects' foundation plan. A plaque on the front right-hand-side pew states that his body lies opposite and beneath the aisle.

St Peter's Church was built using locally made cream-coloured Wondai bricks. The Wondai Brick and Tile Company made several thousand specially moulded bricks for the door and window reveals and the arched heads. In the words of the architects, "the building is "a symphony in brick"". The Shepherd Memorial Church of St Peter was the first major tender won by the Wondai Brickworks, a business commenced by seven local shareholders with a capital of £350. Their successful tender for St Peter's Church led them to discover a suitable clay deposit opposite the Wondai Hospital in Bramston Street, Wondai and establish a factory nearby. After interruption during World War II when the brickworks were taken over by the Australian Army, the business went on to supply bricks throughout southern Queensland, including the former Princess Alexandra Hospital (demolished), Kingaroy Hospital and Wondai Town Hall, as well as houses in the region.

St Peter's Church has been recognised as an important 20th century building. The church's design was influenced by European and Scandinavian styles with high walls and a low-pitched tile roof and wide moulded eaves. Of particular note is the ventilation system which uses exceptionally high walls to give a large air space in proportion to the seating capacity of 100. There are both windows and ventilators but the windows do not open. The ventilators are designed to be opened at night to store cool night air in the roof space. The air heated by the congregation rises through grilles into the roof space and out through the gable ends allowing the cooler air to flow downwards.

An article in Architecture magazine in 1943 described the building as:

"of locally made cream bricks with a tile roof. The plan is a long rectangle with an apse at the east end and a vestry off one side. The entrance is on the south, towards the west end; it is marked by a square tower with a colonnaded lantern at the top surmounted by a weathervane carrying the symbol of St Peter. The organ gallery is above the entrance, whence it is approached by a stair, and opens on to a gallery overlooking the nave. The font is placed immediately opposite the entrance in a gap in the seating, which leaves a few seats between it and the west wall for use at christenings. The pulpit is in brick, and is placed in the south-east corner... The windows have steel frames, and are glazed with heat-resisting glass with a slightly greenish tinge, which helps to give a cool appearance to the interior. The ceiling is of wall board, set out in panels, the sides of the recesses being brilliantly coloured to tone with the windows and the ceiling of the eastern apse."

The furnishings, altar, pews and other fittings, designed by the architects, were made from local hardwood. The cost of building was £2,755 19s 5d.

The Archbishop of Brisbane, William Wand, stated in his opening and consecration of the church that it "is a distinct departure from the usual design of churches in the diocese". The Archbishop had stated that more churches were required to serve the needs of the congregation, as the church building programme had stagnated because of severe financial problems caused by the Depression of the 1930s. Archbishop Wand urged that churches be constructed in stone and brick and compare favourably with the better class of public buildings being erected in the state. Concerned about the standards of ecclesiastical architecture he insisted that he approve the plans before building projects were undertaken. He reminded the clergy of the factors that should be kept in mind when planning churches and urged the desirability of moving away from the old Gothic styles. His primary motive for this, however, was to avoid obscuring the view of the altar by pillars, not concern for climatic conditions. Despite Archbishop Wand's comments, the majority of church buildings erected in the 1930s were small wooden structures - pseudo-Gothic with steep roof and high lancet windows - but frequently they were designed to become parish halls when permanent churches could be erected. It was not until the 1950s that church buildings in Queensland, and indeed Australia, moved away from traditional church building types that employed historical revival styles such as Gothic or Romanesque. The Shepherd Memorial Church of St Peter was a notable exception.

St Peter's execution also reflected the "low church" or more Protestant form of Anglican worship rather than the "high church" (Anglo-Catholic) form that became discernible in the Anglican church from the mid-19th century. Generally, Queensland was more "high church". In this form the sanctuary, associated with the chancel was the most important and therefore most decorated part of any high church. Balconies were not permitted and a south porch, a humble entry, was desirable. "Low church" forms have always existed in Queensland, particularly in the south of the state. Churches following this form of Anglicanism were generally plainer in form and additional rituals such as the use of incense were not practised in them. "Low church" forms of Anglican worship demonstrate more reliance on Biblical teaching.

In 1940 the firm Fowell, McConnel and Mansfield were awarded the Queensland Meritorious Architecture - Country Division - Award: 1940 in the Ecclesiastical and Institutional (including Educational Buildings and Hospitals) Class by the Queensland Chapter of the Royal Australian Institute of Architects. War conditions prevented the presentation being made until 1943.

Both the South Burnett Times, in 1937, and Architecture magazine, in 1943, attributed the church's design mainly to Kenneth Hamlyn McConnel of Fowell and McConnel Architects (1927–1938). McConnel was a member of the well-known family of Queensland graziers associated with "Cressbrook" in the Brisbane Valley. After his World War I service he was an early graduate of Professor Leslie Wilkinson's School of Architecture at Sydney University where he was awarded a University Medal. Fowell and McConnel formed a partnership in 1927 to enter a competition for the design of Tamworth War Memorial Town Hall, for which they were awarded second place. In the following year they were successful in winning the competition for the British Medical Association's building in Sydney's Macquarie Street, for which they won the first Royal Institute of British Architects (RIBA) medal to be awarded in Australia. In 1935 Fowell and MConnel received the Royal Australian Institute of Architects' Sulman Award for St Anne's Church at Bondi, which is in the New South Wales State Heritage Register. It also features a ventilation system using stored cool air to circulate throughout. The partnership went on to design many Catholic churches in Sydney and some New South Wales country towns. McConnel left the partnership of Fowell, McConnel and Mansfield (1939), due to ill health in 1939. After World War II he formed McConnel and Smith, later becoming McConnel, Smith and Johnson. This firm was responsible for the Sydney Law Courts, Queens Square, Sydney Water Board headquarters, and the University of Sydney's law school and faculty of architecture buildings.

In 1969 St George's Anglican Church was relocated from Tingoora to the Proston to serve as the St Peter's Church Hall. St George's had operated in Tingoora from 1921 to 1962. The hall is located behind the church on a different allotment.

On 3 July 1988 St Peter's celebrated its 50th anniversary with the Bishop of the Western Region, Adrian Charles, a former Wondai minister, leading the commemorative service and planting a memorial tree to mark the occasion.

Few changes have been made to St Peter's Church. The ceiling of the nave and the sides of the recesses are no longer brilliantly coloured. The nave's ceiling is painted a brick red and the ceiling above the chancel is blue. Originally the church was intentionally set amongst eucalyptus trees; however, in the intervening years these have been removed and the site is planted with exotic species.

St Peter's Anglican Church was closed and deconsecrated in November 2015 due to declining congregation numbers. As part of the deconsecration process, any human remains need to be located and reinterred. However, the remains of Charles Shepherd were not found in the mortuary chamber as indicated in the church's records. Following information from an elderly man who claimed to be present when Shepherd's remains were placed in another part of the church foundations, in July 2018 church authorities paid for ground-penetrating radar which identified anomalies in the ground that are typical of a burial. A subsequent excavation revealed half a casket handle, a metal snuff box, and carbon material which appear to confirm the burial occurred at that location; these remains were put in a new casket and buried in the Proston local cemetery.

== Description ==
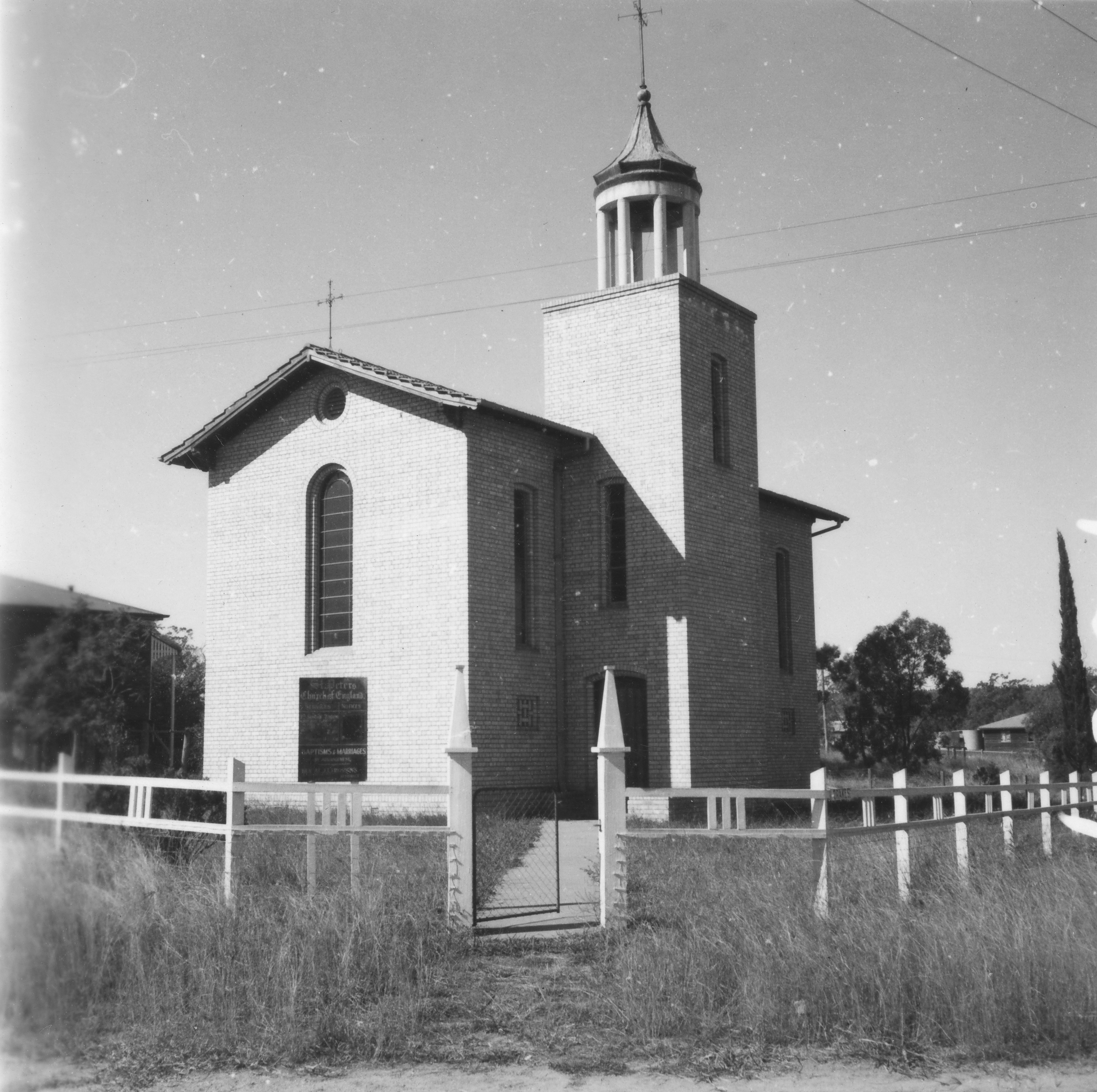
St Peters, 1952

The Shepherd Memorial Church of St Peter is located on the corner of Drake Street and Wondai Road, Proston. The church occupies a parcel of land which falls gently toward Drake Street and includes a number of established trees to the street frontages and a concrete pathway, none of which are considered to be of cultural heritage significance.

An architectural anomaly in an otherwise rural townscape, the church stands as a very austere composition of four simple architectural forms, each accommodating one of the principal interior areas of the church: the entry/bell tower; nave; chancel and vestry. The cavity brick wall construction is exceptional and features pale, sandy coloured cavity face bricks, with flush vertical and recessed horizontal mustard coloured mortar joints, skilfully laid in a combination of English bond and Flemish garden wall bond with brick- on-edge and soldier course detailing. All openings feature stepped reveals externally and stepped mitred reveals internally.

The double height nave of the church is essentially rectangular in plan and runs in an east-west direction under a low pitched gable roof clad with red concrete roof tiles. The eaves are lined with timber boards above exposed decorative rafters that carry half round gutters. A series of long, narrow, high level, arched windows punctuate its northern and southern elevations and contain fixed, nine pane, steel framed windows glazed with randomly set yellow, blue, green and uncoloured obscure glass. Located beneath these windows and of equal width are a series of square, recessed, hit-and-miss brick ventilation panels that reveal the symbol of the cross in their patterning. These baffled ventilation panels, similarly expressed on the interior in metal, are part of the church's passive cooling system, allowing air to be drawn into the church. The western elevation includes a circular timber vent above a single centrally positioned high level window with arched head housing a fixed, thirty two pane, steel framed window glazed with the same palette of coloured glass. Located below the window is the marble foundation stone of the church commemorating benefactor Charles Shepherd.

The square-planned bell tower on the southern elevation contains the entry to the church reached by a set of brick stairs with integrated brick planter boxes. The belltower has a flat concrete roof concealed by parapet walls and is surmounted by a bell enclosure comprising a circular colonnade of eight columns which support a faceted metal clad lantern roof and a weather vane in the likeness of a rooster, the symbol of St Peter. The soffit of this lantern roof is lined with timber boards and the door and window openings are detailed similarly to the nave.

The semi-circular planned chancel with truncated low pitched metal clad roof adjoins the eastern end of the nave of the church and is similarly detailed with narrow windows on the north and south elevations. The sub floor area of the altar accommodates a mortuary chamber in which the late Charles Shepherd, benefactor of the church, is entombed. Enclosing the chamber at the eastern end of the chancel, is a dressed timber panel decorated with a timber cross.

The vestry is expressed as a simple single storey cubic volume with parapet wall adjoining the north elevation of the nave. Centrally positioned steel-framed casement windows punctuate its northern and western elevations. Concrete stairs enclosed by a low level wall lead to a timber-panelled door located in the eastern elevation of the vestry where it adjoins the nave of the church.

Internally the simple plan that gives rise to the austere exterior form of the church is clearly evident.

The bell tower accommodates the entry to the church as well as a first level choir loft above and a second level platform accessed by a timber stair and ladder respectively. The choir loft is expressed directly above the main entry as a small balcony with curved solid balustrade overlooking the nave. Opposite the entry, adjacent to the northern wall of the nave, is a cast concrete baptismal font located between the rows of pews which line each side of the central aisle and are crafted from local hardwood. A brass plaque on the front northern pew states that benefactor, Charles Shepherd, is buried opposite that pew, under the aisle, however, he is entombed under the sanctuary of the chancel. The aisles are covered with carpet, the timber floor under the seating, exposed. The ceiling is coffered and lined with Cane-ite sheets painted dark red with expressed joints and perforated ventilation panels. A system of wall lights on decorative metal brackets, mounted between the windows may be a more recent addition.

The chancel contains two platforms covered with carpet, stepping up to the sanctuary and altar. A large opening in the eastern end of the nave frames the sanctuary beyond and a curved brick wall with centrally suspended curtain creates the backdrop to the sanctuary and altar. Low level, angled brick walls create the altar rail and the elevated pulpit is located in the south-east corner of the chancel behind a curved face brick wall. Both walls are finished with a dressed timber capping. The sanctuary ceiling is lined with Cane-ite and painted light blue.

Notable chancel furnishings crafted from local hardwood include the priest's chair and kneeler, the sanctuary altar piece, secondary chair and kneeler, lectern and wall mounted hymnal boards. The figure of a rooster, symbol of St Peter, is carved into the timber facing panel of the priest's kneeler. Integrated brick shelving in the walls of the chancel accommodate a timber cross and other ceremonial vessels.

A timber panel door on the northern side of the lower altar provides access to the vestry which contains a storage cupboard and a sink area. The timber floor is covered with vinyl and the ceiling is sheeted with masonite finished with cover battens.

== Heritage listing ==
Shepherd Memorial Church of St Peter was listed on the Queensland Heritage Register on 9 November 2012 having satisfied the following criteria.

The place is important in demonstrating the evolution or pattern of Queensland's history.

The church is important in illustrating closer settlement of Queensland through the development of agricultural settlements and establishment of their service towns in rural Queensland until World War II. These towns were the result of the Queensland government's policy of closer settlement of the land and its use of branch railway lines to facilitate this objective.

St Peter's Church demonstrates the establishment phase of town development during which permanent places of worship were built. The church was designed and built during a boom period in Proston's development when the town and region were significant producers of dairy products in Queensland.

St Peter's Church, is important as an early example of modernism in Queensland church architecture, an architectural style which did not become popular for this application until after World War II.

The place is important in demonstrating the principal characteristics of a particular class of cultural places.

The Shepherd Memorial Church of St Peter is important in demonstrating the principal characteristics of an Anglican church in its form and liturgical furniture, while its simplicity and interior treatment represent the "low church" form of Anglican worship.

The church is rectangular in form and comprises a nave which seats a congregation of 100, an east chancel, square tower with a colonnaded lantern, an entrance and an organ gallery above, and on the north side, a vestry.

Both externally and internally St Peter's Church remains substantially unchanged since completion of construction in July 1939.

The place is important because of its aesthetic significance.

St Peter's Church has strong aesthetic value. Its scale and austere fabric and form have been influenced by Romanesque massing principles and twentieth century Scandinavian architectural detailing. The modernist aesthetic of the church juxtaposed with the rural townscape of Proston evokes extreme surprise.

It is significant for its high quality workmanship in particular the face brickwork, which shows the influence of the Modern Movement popular in the 1930s.

The Shepherd Memorial Church of St Peter is an outstanding example of church design for its period and location. Its massing and high quality brickwork are features of the design which show European and Scandinavian influences. The church is also significant for the way it was designed for the climate, through the use of an unusual ventilation system.

The place is important in demonstrating a high degree of creative or technical achievement at a particular period.

St Peter's Church demonstrates a high level of creative achievement. Its architectural excellence and exceptionality is illustrated by its winning the 1940 RAIA Queensland Chapter Award for Ecclesiastical and Institutional Buildings including Educational Buildings and Hospitals - Country Division, which was awarded every five years.
