= Stonelands =

- Suburb
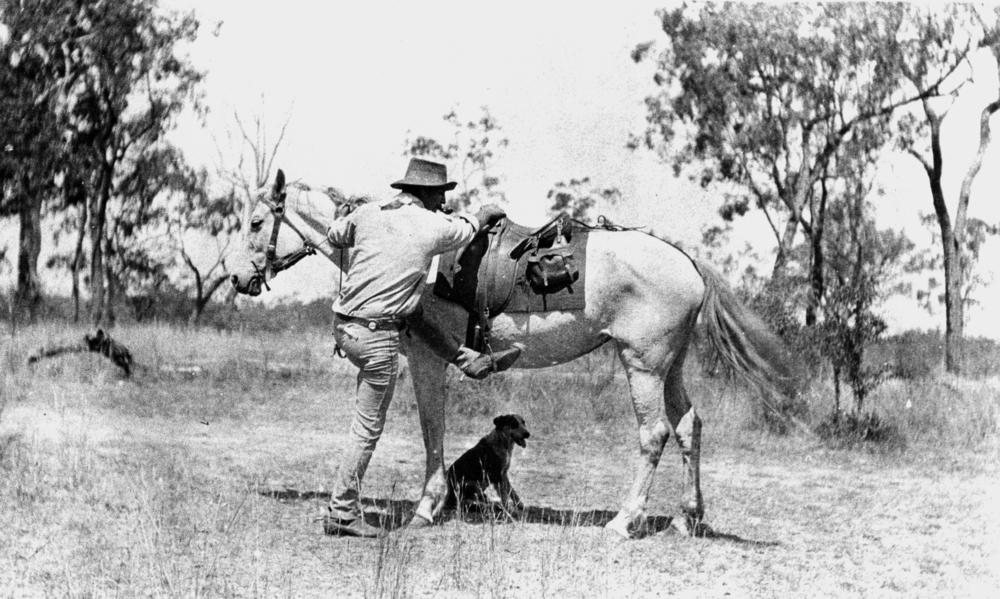
- Stockman at Stonelands, circa 1920

- Interactive map of Stonelands
- Coordinates: 26.0483°S 151.7038°E
- Country: Australia
- State: Queensland
- LGA: South Burnett Region
- Location: 34.2 km (21.3 mi) NW of Murgon; 67.5 km (41.9 mi) N of Kingaroy; 96.5 km (60.0 mi) S of Gayndah; 127 km (79 mi) W of Gympie; 281 km (175 mi) NW of Brisbane

Government
  - State electorate: Nanango
  - Federal division: Flynn

Area
  - Total: 167.6 km^{2} (64.7 sq mi)

Population
  - Total: 34 (2021 census)
  - Density: 0.2029/km^{2} (0.525/sq mi)
- Time zone: UTC+10:00 (AEST)
- Postcode: 4612
Suburbs around Stonelands
Wigton	Wahoon	Booubyjan; Windera
Abbeywood	Stonelands	Glenrock; Wooroonden
Kinleymore	Hivesville; Kawl Kawl	Marshlands

Stonelands is a rural locality in the South Burnett Region, Queensland, Australia. In the 2021 census, Stonelands had a population of 34 people.

== Geography ==
The locality is bounded to the north-east and east by Barambah Creek, which is a tributary of the Burnett River, and to the south-west by Gayndah Hivesville Road.

Beninfi State Forest is in the north-west of the locality and Woroon State Forest 2 is in the west of the locality extending into neighbouring Wigton.

Apart from the state forests, the predominant land use is grazing on native vegetation with some crop-growing and plantation forestry.

== History ==
Stonelands State School opened on 25 January 1932 and closed on 31 March 1967. It was at 983 Stonelands Road (26.0826°S 151.7140°E). It was immediately west of the homestead of Stonelands pastoral station (26.0831°S 151.7199°E).

== Demographics ==
In the 2016 census, Stonelands had a population of 51 people.

In the 2021 census, Stonelands had a population of 34 people.

== Education ==
There are no schools in Stonelands. The nearest government primary schools are Windera State School in neighbouring Windera to the north-east, Cloyna State School in Cloyna to the east, and Proston State School in Proston to the south-west. The nearest government secondary schools are Proston State School (to Year 10), Murgon State High School (to Year 12) in Murgon to the south-east and Burnett State College (to Year 12) in Gayndah to the north.

== Facilities ==
Despite the name, Abbeywood Rural Fire Station is at 6461 Gayndah Hivesville Road in Stonelands (26.1200°S 151.6614°E); the Gayndah Hivesville Road is the border between the localities of Stonelands and Abbeywood.
