= Electoral results for the district of Nanango =

Queensland, Australia, district election results

This is a list of electoral results for the electoral district of Nanango in Queensland state elections.

== Members for Nanango ==
First incarnation (1912–1950)
Member	Party	Term
Robert Hodge	Farmers' Union	1912–1920
James Edwards	Country	1920–1947
Joh Bjelke-Petersen	Country	1947–1950
Second incarnation (2001–present)
Member	Party	Term
Dorothy Pratt	Independent	2001–2012
Deb Frecklington	Liberal National	2012–present

== Election results ==
=== Elections in the 2020s ===
2024 Queensland state election: Nanango
Party	Candidate	Votes	%	±%
Liberal National	Deb Frecklington	19,319	55.27	+5.37
Labor	Val Heward	6,071	17.37	−10.33
One Nation	Adam Maslen	4,210	12.05	−2.65
Independent	Jason Miles	1,892	5.41	−0.89
Legalise Cannabis	Anthony Hopkins	1,350	3.86	−0.34
Greens	Angus Ryan	1,120	3.21	−0.29
Family First	Benjamin Mitchell	693	1.98	+1.98
Independent	Nathan Hope	295	0.85	+0.85
Total formal votes		34,952	95.85	
Informal votes		1,514	4.15	
Turnout		36,466	88.77	
Two-party-preferred result
Liberal National	Deb Frecklington	25,488	72.92	+10.72
Labor	Val Heward	7,755	27.08	−10.72
Liberal National hold		Swing	+10.72	

2020 Queensland state election: Nanango
Party	Candidate	Votes	%	±%
Liberal National	Deb Frecklington	16,085	49.91	+1.91
Labor	Mark Stapleton	8,908	27.64	+8.37
One Nation	Tony Scrimshaw	4,737	14.70	−12.74
Legalise Cannabis	Maggie O'Rance	1,342	4.16	+4.16
Greens	John Harbison	1,154	3.58	−1.71
Total formal votes		32,226	97.40	+0.77
Informal votes		859	2.60	−0.77
Turnout		33,085	89.01	−0.59
Two-party-preferred result
Liberal National	Deb Frecklington	20,049	62.21	−3.70
Labor	Mark Stapleton	12,177	37.79	+3.70
Liberal National hold		Swing	−3.70	

=== Elections in the 2010s ===
2017 Queensland state election: Nanango
Party	Candidate	Votes	%	±%
Liberal National	Deb Frecklington	15,053	48.0	+1.6
One Nation	Douglas Grant	8,606	27.4	+27.4
Labor	Ben Rankin	6,044	19.3	−0.8
Greens	John Harbison	1,658	5.3	+1.6
Total formal votes		31,361	96.6	−1.6
Informal votes		1,091	3.4	+1.6
Turnout		32,452	89.6	−1.3
Two-candidate-preferred result
Liberal National	Deb Frecklington	19,871	63.4	+0.1
One Nation	Douglas Grant	11,490	36.6	+36.6
Liberal National hold		Swing	+0.1	

2015 Queensland state election: Nanango
Party	Candidate	Votes	%	±%
Liberal National	Deb Frecklington	14,698	47.11	+1.67
Labor	Liz Hollens-Riley	6,397	20.50	+9.95
Katter's Australian	Ray Hopper	4,827	15.47	−10.86
Palmer United	Jason Ford	3,269	10.48	+10.48
Greens	Grant Newson	1,170	3.75	+0.08
Independent	Dean Love	841	2.70	+2.70
Total formal votes		31,202	98.09	−0.01
Informal votes		606	1.91	+0.01
Turnout		31,808	91.89	−0.59
Two-party-preferred result
Liberal National	Deb Frecklington	16,491	63.16	+4.19
Labor	Liz Hollens-Riley	9,617	36.84	+36.84
Liberal National hold		Swing	+4.19	

2012 Queensland state election: Nanango
Party	Candidate	Votes	%	±%
Liberal National	Deb Frecklington	13,493	45.44	+4.81
Katter's Australian	Carl Rackemann	7,818	26.33	+26.33
Independent	John Dalton	3,804	12.81	+12.81
Labor	Virginia Clarke	3,134	10.55	−4.80
Greens	Grant Newson	1,090	3.67	−0.25
Independent	David Thomson	357	1.20	+1.20
Total formal votes		29,696	98.10	−0.48
Informal votes		575	1.90	+0.48
Turnout		30,271	92.48	−0.11
Two-candidate-preferred result
Liberal National	Deb Frecklington	14,705	58.98	+11.88
Katter's Australian	Carl Rackemann	10,229	41.02	+41.02
Liberal National gain from Independent		Swing	+11.88	

=== Elections in the 2000s ===
2009 Queensland state election: Nanango
Party	Candidate	Votes	%	±%
Liberal National	John Bjelke-Petersen	11,644	40.6	−3.9
Independent	Dorothy Pratt	11,492	40.1	+6.8
Labor	Danielle Randall	4,398	15.3	−1.6
Greens	Frida Forsberg	1,124	3.9	+3.7
Total formal votes		28,658	98.4	
Informal votes		412	1.6	
Turnout		29,070	92.6	
Two-candidate-preferred result
Independent	Dorothy Pratt	13,599	52.9	+0.1
Liberal National	John Bjelke-Petersen	12,108	47.1	−0.1
Independent hold		Swing	+0.1	

2006 Queensland state election: Nanango
Party	Candidate	Votes	%	±%
Independent	Dorothy Pratt	9,721	43.5	−2.2
National	John Bjelke-Petersen	8,895	39.8	+12.3
Labor	Mark Whittaker	3,238	14.5	−2.3
Family First	Trevor Dent	513	2.3	+2.3
Total formal votes		22,367	98.4	+0.1
Informal votes		355	1.6	−0.1
Turnout		22,722	92.1	−1.0
Two-candidate-preferred result
Independent	Dorothy Pratt	11,051	54.2	−8.5
National	John Bjelke-Petersen	9,323	45.8	+8.5
Independent hold		Swing	−8.5	

2004 Queensland state election: Nanango
Party	Candidate	Votes	%	±%
Independent	Dorothy Pratt	9,989	45.7	−0.5
National	Nina Temperton	6,017	27.5	+1.7
Labor	Nick Holliday	3,667	16.8	−11.3
One Nation	Bob Gold	1,550	7.1	+7.1
Greens	Desiree Mahoney	646	3.0	+3.0
Total formal votes		21,869	98.3	+0.4
Informal votes		368	1.7	−0.4
Turnout		22,237	93.1	−1.2
Two-candidate-preferred result
Independent	Dorothy Pratt	11,553	62.7	−4.4
National	Nina Temperton	6,864	37.3	+37.3
Independent hold		Swing	−4.4	

2001 Queensland state election: Nanango
Party	Candidate	Votes	%	±%
Independent	Dorothy Pratt	9,680	46.2	+46.2
Labor	Alan Weir	5,882	28.1	+9.7
National	Keith Campbell	5,400	25.8	−4.8
Total formal votes		20,962	97.9	
Informal votes		451	2.1	
Turnout		21,413	94.3	
Two-candidate-preferred result
Independent	Dorothy Pratt	12,796	67.1	+67.1
Labor	Alan Weir	6,282	32.9	+32.9
Independent gain from One Nation		Swing	+67.1	

=== Elections in the 1940s ===
1947 Queensland state election: Nanango
Party	Candidate	Votes	%	±%
Country	Joh Bjelke-Petersen	3,733	42.0	−8.1
Frank Barnes Labor	Phil Cameron	2,164	24.4	+24.4
Labor	Daniel Carroll	2,028	22.8	−13.4
Independent Country	Cliff Edwards	753	8.5	+8.5
Independent Labor	Samuel Andrewartha	202	2.3	+2.3
Total formal votes		8,880	99.1	0.0
Informal votes		82	0.9	0.0
Turnout		8,962	93.1	+6.9
Country hold		Swing	N/A	

1944 Queensland state election: Nanango
Party	Candidate	Votes	%	±%
Country	James Edwards	4,319	50.1	+5.0
Labor	Daniel Carroll	3,120	36.2	−4.6
Independent	George Anderson	1,176	13.7	−0.4
Total formal votes		8,615	99.1	−0.3
Informal votes		75	0.9	+0.3
Turnout		8,690	86.2	−4.8
Country hold		Swing	+5.5	

1941 Queensland state election: Nanango
Party	Candidate	Votes	%	±%
Country	James Edwards	4,052	45.1	+2.5
Labor	Cecil Tracey	3,668	40.8	+12.4
Independent	George Anderson	1,271	14.1	+14.1
Total formal votes		8,991	99.4	+0.1
Informal votes		55	0.6	−0.1
Turnout		9,046	91.0	−3.6
Two-party-preferred result
Country	James Edwards	4,569	52.6	−5.3
Labor	Cecil Tracey	4,120	47.4	+47.4
Country hold		Swing	N/A	

=== Elections in the 1930s ===
1938 Queensland state election: Nanango
Party	Candidate	Votes	%	±%
Country	James Edwards	3,719	42.6	−21.1
Ind. Social Credit	Henry Madden	2,524	29.0	+29.0
Labor	Horace Davies	2,476	28.4	+28.4
Total formal votes		8,719	99.3	+1.4
Informal votes		63	0.7	−1.4
Turnout		8,782	94.6	+2.5
Two-candidate-preferred result
Country	James Edwards	4,079	57.9	−5.8
Ind. Social Credit	Henry Madden	2,963	42.1	+42.1
Country hold		Swing	N/A	

1935 Queensland state election: Nanango
Party	Candidate	Votes	%	±%
CPNP	James Edwards	5,168	63.7	
Independent	Andrew Knox	2,948	36.3	
Total formal votes		8,116	97.9	
Informal votes		172	2.1	
Turnout		8,288	92.1	
CPNP hold		Swing		

1932 Queensland state election: Nanango
Party	Candidate	Votes	%	±%
CPNP	James Edwards	4,162	56.3	
Labor	Thomas Reordan	2,442	33.0	
Independent	G.W. Young	791	10.7	
Total formal votes		7,395	99.5	
Informal votes		40	0.5	
Turnout		7,435	94.5	
CPNP hold		Swing		

=== Elections in the 1920s ===
1929 Queensland state election: Nanango
Party	Candidate	Votes	%	±%
CPNP	James Edwards	3,930	59.2	−1.1
Independent	Wilfred Osborne	2,712	40.8	+40.8
Total formal votes		6,642	98.3	+1.0
Informal votes		113	1.7	−1.0
Turnout		6,755	87.2	−3.3
CPNP hold		Swing	N/A	

1926 Queensland state election: Nanango
Party	Candidate	Votes	%	±%
CPNP	James Edwards	3,606	60.3	+13.4
Labor	Robert Webster	2,066	34.6	−5.1
Primary Producers	William O'Mara	304	5.1	+5.1
Total formal votes		5,976	97.3	−1.3
Informal votes		167	2.7	+1.3
Turnout		6,143	90.5	+3.7
CPNP hold		Swing	N/A	

1923 Queensland state election: Nanango
Party	Candidate	Votes	%	±%
Country	James Edwards	2,852	46.9	+11.4
Labor	Robert Webster	2,414	39.7	+13.1
Independent Country	Robert Hodge	809	13.3	+13.3
Total formal votes		6,075	98.6	+0.6
Informal votes		87	1.4	−0.6
Turnout		6,162	86.8	+3.7
Two-party-preferred result
Country	James Edwards	3.426	58.1	
Labor	Robert Webster	2,468	41.9	
Country gain from Independent Country		Swing	N/A	

1920 Queensland state election: Nanango
Party	Candidate	Votes	%	±%
Independent Country	James Edwards	2,740	37.9	+37.9
Country	Robert Hodge	2,564	35.5	+35.5
Labor	Robert Wallace	1,917	26.6	−18.1
Total formal votes		7,221	98.0	−0.9
Informal votes		148	2.0	+0.9
Turnout		7,369	83.1	+2.5
Two-candidate-preferred result
Independent Country	James Edwards	2,969	52.3	+52.3
Country	Robert Hodge	2,711	47.7	+47.7
Independent Country gain from National		Swing	N/A	

=== Elections in the 1910s ===
1918 Queensland state election: Nanango
Party	Candidate	Votes	%	±%
National	Robert Hodge	3,732	55.3	+55.3
Labor	Walter Burton	3,017	44.7	+0.5
Total formal votes		6,749	98.9	+0.2
Informal votes		75	1.1	−0.2
Turnout		6,824	80.6	−6.1
National gain from Farmers' Union		Swing	N/A	

- Sitting member Robert Hodge was elected at the previous election as a Farmers' Union candidate. He joined the National Party before this election.

1915 Queensland state election: Nanango
Party	Candidate	Votes	%	±%
Farmers' Union	Robert Hodge	3,167	55.8	+55.8
Labor	Thomas Armstrong	2,509	44.2	+8.0
Total formal votes		5,676	98.7	0.0
Informal votes		75	1.3	0.0
Turnout		5,751	86.7	+17.2
Farmers' Union gain from Liberal		Swing	N/A	

1912 Queensland state election: Nanango
Party	Candidate	Votes	%	±%
Liberal	Robert Hodge	2,379	63.8	
Labor	Maurice Harland	1,348	36.2	
Total formal votes		3,727	98.7	
Informal votes		48	1.3	
Turnout		3,775	69.5	
Liberal hold		Swing		
