= Kinleymore =

- Suburb
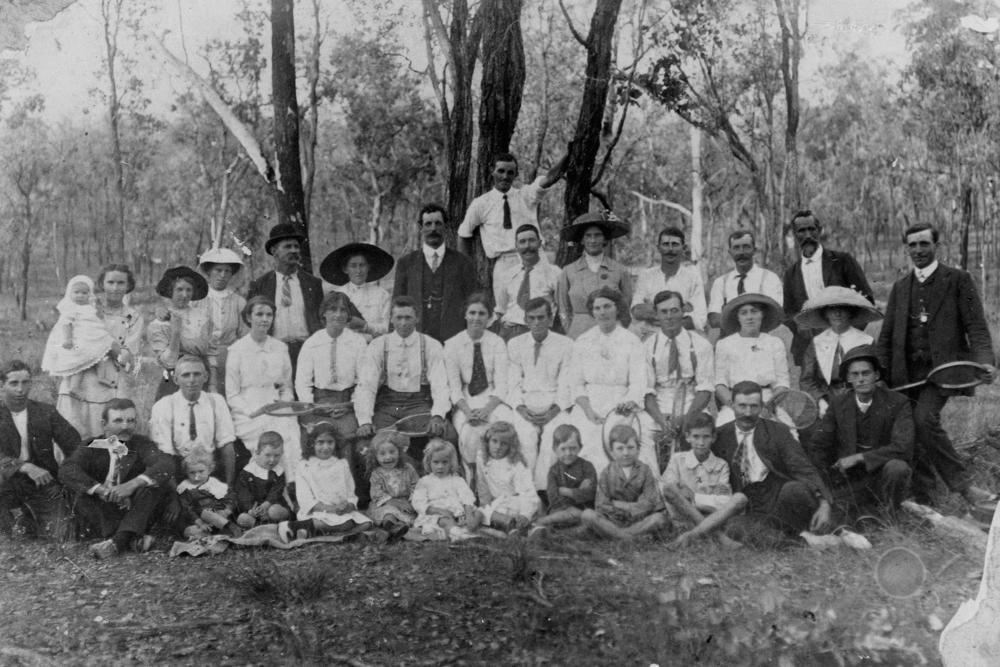
- Congregation of the Kinleymore Methodist Church, 1911

- Interactive map of Kinleymore
- Coordinates: 26.1774°S 151.6566°E
- Country: Australia
- State: Queensland
- LGA: South Burnett Region
- Location: 36.3 km (22.6 mi) WNW of Murgon; 58.6 km (36.4 mi) NNW of Kingaroy; 133 km (83 mi) W of Gympie; 288 km (179 mi) NW of Brisbane

Government
  - State electorate: Nanango
  - Federal division: Flynn

Area
  - Total: 48.1 km^{2} (18.6 sq mi)

Population
  - Total: 69 (2021 census)
  - Density: 1.435/km^{2} (3.715/sq mi)
- Time zone: UTC+10:00 (AEST)
- Postcode: 4613
Suburbs around Kinleymore
| Stalworth | Abbeywood | Stonelands |
| Proston | Kinleymore | Hivesville |
| Melrose | Melrose | Mount McEuen |

Kinleymore is a rural locality in the South Burnett Region, Queensland, Australia. In the 2021 census, Kinleymore had a population of 69 people.

== Geography ==
The Proston railway line enters the locality from the east (Hivesville), passes through Kinleymore railway station (26.1851°S 151.6551°E) in the centre of the locality, and then exits to the west (Proston). The line no longer operates and the station is abandoned.

== History ==
The locality was named after three of the original settlers in the area by combining parts of their surnames (Kinnear, Leys, Morey).

In the very earliest days of settlement, Mr A. Ley operated a butcher shop at Kinleymore.

Kinleymore Provisional School opened on 20 June 1913. On 1 February 1918, it became Kinleymore State School. It closed on 31 December 1969. The school was on the southern corner of Kinleymore School Road and Middle Road (26.1785°S 151.6555°E).

A 1920 newspaper notice in the Nanango News listing polling places for the October state election, mentions a Seymour's Hall at Kinleymore.

The local railway station on the Proston railway line was originally called Mobill (reported as a Waka language word meaning stony country), but was renamed Kinleymore on 2 March 1923. The section of the railway line that passes through the locality closed on 25 January 1993.

A community hall existed at Kinleymore on the western corner of Wondai Proston Road and Middle Road (approx 26.1777°S 151.6545°E) for several decades until it was removed to another location.

== Demographics ==
In the 2016 census, Kinleymore had a population of 93 people.

In the 2021 census, Kinleymore had a population of 69 people.

== Education ==
There are no schools in Kinleymore. The nearest government primary school is Proston State School in neighbouring Proston to the west. The nearest government secondary schools are Proston State School (to Year 10) and Murgon State High School (to Year 12) in Murgon to the east.
