= Okeden, Queensland =

Okeden
- Suburb
- Interactive map of Okeden
- Coordinates: 26.1649°S 151.5011°E
- Country: Australia
- State: Queensland
- LGA: South Burnett Region
- Location: 57.0 km (35.4 mi) W of Murgon; 66.9 km (41.6 mi) NW of Kingaroy; 149 km (93 mi) W of Gympie; 284 km (176 mi) NW of Brisbane

Government
  - State electorate: Nanango
  - Federal division: Flynn

Area
  - Total: 199.6 km^{2} (77.1 sq mi)

Population
  - Total: 53 (2021 census)
  - Density: 0.2655/km^{2} (0.688/sq mi)
- Time zone: UTC+10:00 (AEST)
- Postcode: 4613
Suburbs around Okeden
Boondooma	Speedwell	Stalworth
Boondooma	Okeden	Proston
Brigooda	Coverty	Melrose

Okeden is a rural locality in the South Burnett Region, Queensland, Australia. In the 2021 census, Okeden had a population of 53 people.

== Geography ==
The Boondooma Dam and its associated lake is on north-western boundary between Okeden and Boondooma.

== History ==
The locality shares its name with the parish, which in turn was named after pastoralist and public servant David Parry-Okeden who managed the Burrandowan pastoral run in the 1850s.

== Demographics ==
In the 2016 census, Okeden had a population of 26 people.

In the 2021 census, Okeden had a population of 53 people.

== Amenities ==
There is a boat ramp and pontoon at the eastern side of dam on Boondooma Dam Road (26.1020°S 151.4500°E). It is managed by the South Burnett Regional Council.

== Education ==
There are no schools in Okeden. The nearest government school, Proston State School in neighbouring Proston to the east, provides primary education and secondary education to Year 10. For secondary education to Year 12, the nearest government school is Murgon State High School in Murgon to the east.
