= Greenview, Queensland =

Greenview
- Suburb
- Interactive map of Greenview
- Coordinates: 26.3094°S 151.8080°E
- Country: Australia
- State: Queensland
- LGA: South Burnett Region
- Location: 21.9 km (13.6 mi) SW of Murgon; 30.3 km (18.8 mi) N of Kingaroy; 114 km (71 mi) W of Gympie; 243 km (151 mi) NW of Brisbane

Government
  - State electorate: Nanango
  - Federal division: Flynn

Area
  - Total: 30.6 km^{2} (11.8 sq mi)

Population
  - Total: 78 (2021 census)
  - Density: 2.549/km^{2} (6.60/sq mi)
- Time zone: UTC+10:00 (AEST)
- Postcode: 4606
Suburbs around Greenview
Fairdale	Chelmsford	Chelmsford
MP Creek	Greenview	Wondai
Cushnie	Cushnie	Tingoora

Greenview is a rural locality in the South Burnett Region, Queensland, Australia. In the 2021 census, Greenview had a population of 78 people.

== History ==
Greenview Provisional School opened in July 1905. On 1 January 1909, it became Greenview State School. It closed in 1935. It re-opened in 1948 and finally closed in 1973. It was located at 696 Tingoora Chelmsford Road (26.3139°S 151.8038°E).

== Demographics ==
In the 2016 census, Greenview had a population of 93 people.

In the 2021 census, Greenview had a population of 78 people.

== Education ==
There are no schools in Greenview. The nearest government primary schools are Wondai State School in neighbouring Wondai to the east and Tingoora State School in neighbouring Tingoora to the south-east. The nearest government secondary schools are Wondai State School (to Year 10) and Murgon State High School in Murgon to the north-east. There is also a Catholic primary school in Murgon.
