= Abbeywood, Queensland =

Abbeywood
- Suburb
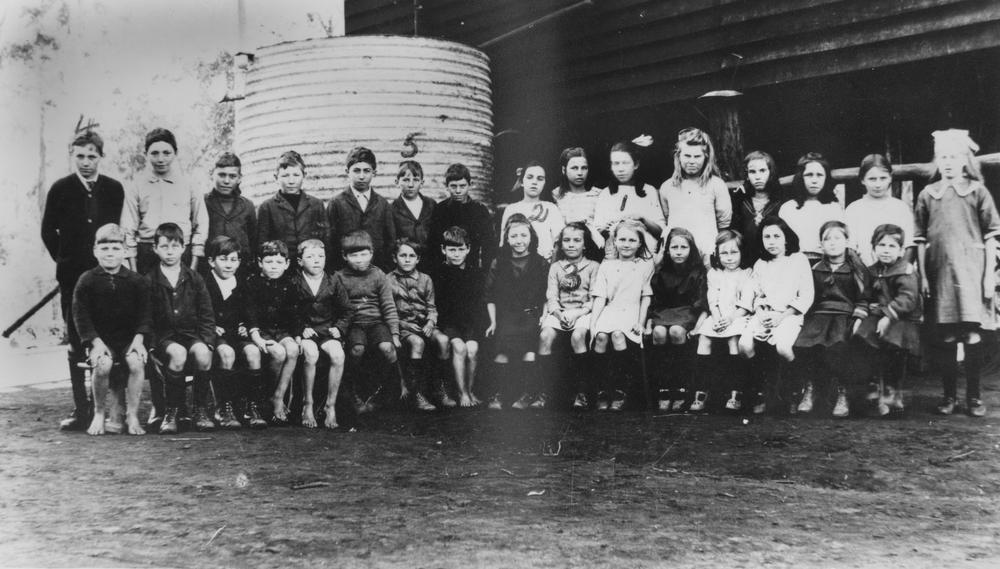
- Pupils from the Abbeywood School, c. 1924

- Interactive map of Abbeywood
- Coordinates: 26.1038°S 151.6455°E
- Country: Australia
- State: Queensland
- LGA: South Burnett Region
- Location: 10.7 km (6.6 mi) NW of Proston; 43.4 km (27.0 mi) WNW of Murgon; 63.9 km (39.7 mi) N of Kingaroy; 136 km (85 mi) W of Gympie; 281 km (175 mi) NW of Brisbane

Government
  - State electorate: Nanango
  - Federal division: Flynn

Area
  - Total: 34.9 km^{2} (13.5 sq mi)

Population
  - Total: 38 (2021 census)
  - Density: 1.089/km^{2} (2.82/sq mi)
- Time zone: UTC+10:00 (AEST)
- Postcode: 4613
Suburbs around Abbeywood
Wigton	Wigton	Stonelands
Stalworth	Abbeywood	Stonelands
Stalworth	Kinleymore	Stonelands

Abbeywood is a rural locality in the South Burnett Region, Queensland, Australia. In the 2021 census, Abbeywood had a population of 38 people.

== Geography ==
The land use is plantation forestry and grazing on native vegetation.

== History ==
Abbeywood Provisional School operated between August 1912 and July 1913 as a half-time school with Speedwell Provisional School (meaning they shared a single teacher between them). In November 1914, Abbeywood State School was established at 402 Cridlands Road (26.1070°S 151.6292°E). Sydney Shaw was the first teacher at Abbeywood Provisional and then was transferred to the State School. The school closed on 31 December 1969.

The name of the district was selected by schools' inspector Clement Lynam Fox when he approved the establishment of Abbeywood State School, choosing the name of his home town in England. Prior to this the area was known interchangeably as the 'Overseas Settlement' or the 'Oswestry Grange Settlement', these names arising from the fact that a number of the newly surveyed blocks for selection were reserved for new immigrants and many of these had arrived on the ship Oswestry Grange. These early settlers formed a progress association which agitated government authorities for improvements such as roads, schools at both Abbeywood and nearby Speedwell and a branch railway line which was later opened in 1923 to a new terminus at Proston, including a station at Hivesville. The nearby village of Hivesville was for many years the main town of business for these early farmers. These first settlers, took up uncleared selections of virgin bush, with most between 300 and 350 acres in size. The price was seventeen shillings and sixpence an acre, payable to the Queensland Lands Department over thirty-three years in annual installments, at an interest rate of three percent. Initially the bush and scrub was cleared and then corn and Rhodes grass planted. Income was generated through dairying, with the cream being sent by rail to Maryborough in the earliest years and later to Murgon. Excess milk was fed to pigs which generated further income and calves from the cows were also sold. Corn was the most regular crop. The system was viable, but only just, and there were many hard years. Throughout the area, sub-district locality place names were gradually adopted, usually when a school, hall, rail siding or other building was initiated - such as Speedwell and Stalworth or Kinleymore.

One of the first selectors to take up a bush block for development into a farm was John (Reuben) Bull with his wife Louisa and six children in 1910. Others which followed closely were Leonard Hatchett, Sydney Shaw, John Slinger, George Perkins, A. Chesterton, Martin Comerford, Martin McGovern, E.J.Cridland, William Waters, Wildfred Welch, Ezekial York, Henry Holdsworth and Harry Olsen.

The earliest settlers joined with those at nearby Speedwell to form a progress association and collectively agitated government for improvements such as the railway line to Proston, better constructed roads and schools. Funds were raised locally to build a hall at nearby Stalworth which became a popular venue for dances and social events.

== Demographics ==
In the 2016 census, Abbeywood had a population of 23 people.

In the 2021 census, Abbeywood had a population of 38 people.

== Education ==
There are no schools in Abbeywood. The nearest government primary school is Proston State School in Proston to the south-west. The nearest government secondary schools are the Proston State School (to Year 10) in Proston and Murgon State High School in Murgon to the south-east.

== Facilities ==
Despite the name, Abbeywood Rural Fire Station is at 6461 Gayndah Hivesville Road in neighbouring Stonelands (26.1200°S 151.6614°E); the Gayndah Hivesville Road is the border between the localities of Stonelands and Abbeywood.
