= Stalworth, Queensland =

Suburb in Queensland, Australia

Stalworth
- Suburb
- Interactive map of Stalworth
- Coordinates: 26.1108°S 151.5955°E
- Country: Australia
- State: Queensland
- LGA: South Burnett Region
- Location: 10.8 km (6.7 mi) N of Proston; 47.9 km (29.8 mi) NW of Murgon; 70.3 km (43.7 mi) NNW of Kingaroy; 140 km (87 mi) W of Gympie; 295 km (183 mi) NNW of Brisbane

Government
  - State electorate: Nanango
  - Federal division: Flynn

Area
  - Total: 45.1 km^{2} (17.4 sq mi)

Population
  - Total: 37 (2021 census)
  - Density: 0.820/km^{2} (2.125/sq mi)
- Time zone: UTC+10:00 (AEST)
- Postcode: 4613
Suburbs around Stalworth
Speedwell	Wigton	Abbeywood
Speedwell	Stalworth	Abbeywood
Okeden	Proston	Kinleymore

Stalworth is a rural locality in the South Burnett Region, Queensland, Australia. In the 2021 census, Stalworth had a population of 37 people.

== Geography ==
Okeden Road forms most of the south-western boundary of the locality.

Hopefield is a neighbourhood in the centre of the locality (26.1166°S 151.6°E).

The land use is predominantly grazing on native vegetation with some crop growing and plantation forestry.

== History ==
The locality was officially named and bounded by government on 16 October 1998, although the locality name has been used since the earliest days of settlement.

A hall was built at Stalworth which hosted dances and social events for many years. It opened on Saturday 21 September 1929. It was later extended with significant alternations and improvements which were opened on Saturday 3 March 1934. Church services and activities were also held in the hall regularly. A Stalworth branch society within the Christian Endeavour movement met in the hall and they hosted the Weinholt Christian Endeavour Union rally there in 1937. The hall was on the south-west corner of the intersection of Speedwell Abbeyward Road and Stalwood Road (approx 26.1085°S 151.5962°E).

Other social activities in the district included the formation of a Stalworth local soccer team.

There was also a cheese factory at Stalworth for a short time. Newspaper articles from 1925 report that it was destroyed by fire on 30 December 1924 along with the adjoining residence, and the circumstances were regarded as suspicious with the possibility of insurance fraud. It was insured for £1100 and was owned at the time by E.V.Hobbs who did not reside there but engaged a caretaker. The caretaker was James Wardill. A local farmer giving evidence at the subsequent inquiry held in Wondai Court House testified that the factory had by then been in disuse for many years, however the owner testified that his son-in-law had operated the cheese plant for a short time between approximately 1919 and 1922 generating turnover to the value of £6000. An advertisement was placed in the Maryborough Chronicle, Wide Bay and Burnett Advertiser newspaper on 6 June 1917 calling for tenders to construct the Stalworth cheese factory by its proprietor E.T.Howes of Memerambi.

One of the first settlers in the district was Sydney Shaw, who subsequently became the first teacher at nearby Abbeywood State School.

Communication services were established relatively early. Telephone was first made available at Stalworth on 25 March 1926. Further, the district is mentioned in the Commonwealth of Australia Gazette 23 June 1932 when the Postmaster General was calling for tenders for mail delivery in the area - "Proston and Proston, via Block 10, Stalworth Post Office, Slingers and Jingeri letter-box, twice a week. Tenderers to state additional price required for three trips a week."

== Demographics ==
In the 2016 census, Stalworth had a population of 33 people.

In the 2021 census, Stalworth had a population of 37 people.

== Education ==
There are no schools in Stalworth. The nearest government school is Proston State School in neighbouring Proston which provides primary and secondary schools (to Year 10). The nearest government secondary school providing education to Year 12 is Murgon State High School in Murgon.

Children living in the area attended primary school at Abbeywood State School while it operated between the years 1914 and 1969.
