= Speedwell, Queensland =

Speedwell
- Suburb
- Interactive map of Speedwell
- Coordinates: 26.0677°S 151.5469°E
- Country: Australia
- State: Queensland
- LGA: South Burnett Region
- Location: 14.6 km (9.1 mi) NW of Proston; 56.9 km (35.4 mi) WNW of Murgon; 79.3 km (49.3 mi) NNW of Kingaroy; 149 km (93 mi) W of Gympie; 308 km (191 mi) NNW of Brisbane

Government
  - State electorate: Nanango
  - Federal division: Flynn

Area
  - Total: 64.0 km^{2} (24.7 sq mi)

Population
  - Total: 42 (2021 census)
  - Density: 0.656/km^{2} (1.700/sq mi)
- Time zone: UTC+10:00 (AEST)
- Postcode: 4613
Suburbs around Speedwell
Wigton	Wigton	Wigton
Boondooma	Speedwell	Wigton
Okeden	Stalworth	Stalworth

Speedwell is a rural locality in the South Burnett Region, Queensland, Australia. In the 2021 census, Speedwell had a population of 42 people.

== Geography ==
The Okeden Byanda Road enters the locality from the south (Okeden) and runs north through the locality, then forms the north-western boundary of the locality before exiting to the north (Wigton).

The land use is predominantly grazing on native vegetation with some production forestry and crop growing.

== History ==
Speedwell Provisional School operated from 12 August 1912 to July 1913 as a half-time provisional school with Abbeywood Provisional School (meaning they shared a single teacher between them). It then became a full-time provisional school (having its own teacher). In 1914, tenders were received to erect a state school building. On 1 January 1915, it opened as Speedwell State School. It closed on 28 January 1963. It was at the kink in Speedwell School Road (26.0751°S 151.5421°E).

Speedwell Baptist Church opened on Sunday 16 April 1916. In 1967, the church building and congregation relocated to Proston.

== Demographics ==
In the 2016 census, Speedwell had a population of 28 people.

In the 2021 census, Speedwell had a population of 42 people.

== Education ==
There are no schools in Speedwell. The nearest government school is Proston State School (Prep to Year 10) in Proston to the south-east. The nearest government secondary school providing schooling to Year 12 is Murgon State High School in Murgon to the south-east, but for students in the west of Speedwell, it might be too distant for a daily commute with the alternatives being distance education and boarding school.
