= Tingoora =

- Town
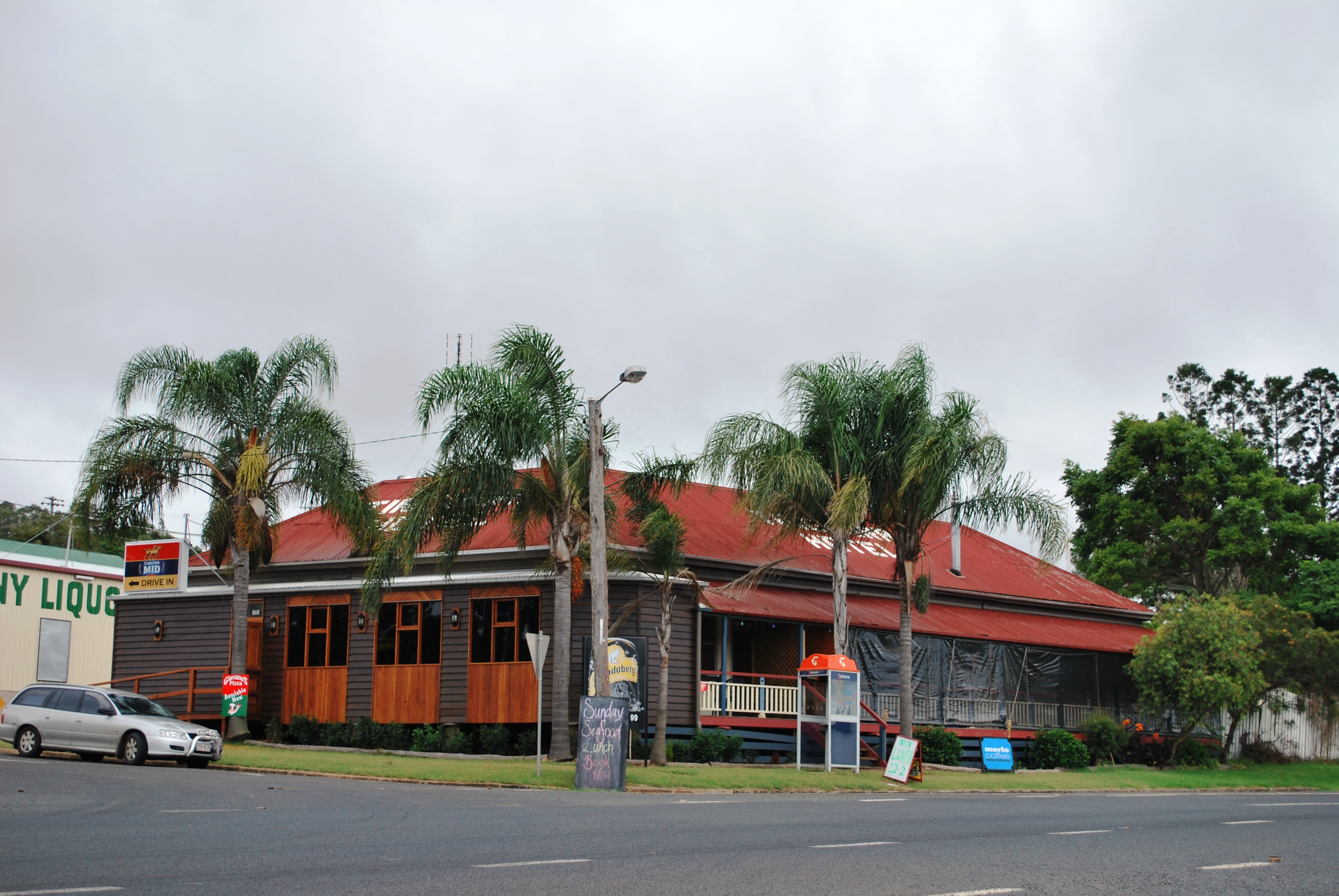
- Tingoora Hotel

- Interactive map of Tingoora
- Coordinates: 26.3608°S 151.8222°E
- Country: Australia
- State: Queensland
- LGA: South Burnett Region
- Location: 22.6 km (14.0 mi) SW of Murgon; 22.9 km (14.2 mi) N of Kingaroy; 115 km (71 mi) WSW of Gympie; 235 km (146 mi) NW of Brisbane

Government
  - State electorate: Nanango
  - Federal division: Flynn

Area
  - Total: 19.7 km^{2} (7.6 sq mi)

Population
  - Total: 272 (2021 census)
  - Density: 13.81/km^{2} (35.76/sq mi)
- Time zone: UTC+10:00 (AEST)
- Postcode: 4608
Localities around Tingoora
Cushnie	Greenview	Wondai
Cushnie	Tingoora	Charlestown
Cushnie	Wooroolin	Charlestown

Tingoora is a rural town and a locality in the South Burnett Region, Queensland, Australia. In the 2021 census, the locality of Tingoora had a population of 272 people.

== Geography ==
The town is on the Bunya Highway, 249 kilometres (155 mi) north west of the state capital, Brisbane. The Chinchilla–Wondai Road (State Route 82) enters from the west and terminates in a T-intersection with the Bunya Highway.

== History ==
Charlestown Provisional School opened circa 1894 and closed circa 1894.

The Kilkvan to Goomeri section of the Nanango railway line opened in December 1904, with Tingoora served by the now-abandoned Tingoora railway station (26.3636°S 151.8218°E). The town takes its name from the railway station which was named for the local Indigenous Australian word in the Waka language for the wattle tree. The Tingoora railway bridge is the longest surviving wooden railway bridge in the South Burnett. The Theebine to Kingaroy line was officially closed in early 2010. The restored curved railway bridge is now part of the Kingaroy to Kilkivan Rail Trail.

The Tingoora Hotel, established in 1900, was reportedly the first public building in the town.

In November 1904, 14 allotments were advertised for selection as agricultural farms by the Department of Public Lands office. The advertising map states the allotments were situated in the Parishes of Charlestown and Wooroolin in the county of Fitzroy, Nanango land agent's district, shire of Nanango with J.H. Adair named as the surveyor. The area described in the map is today approximately bounded by Tingoora Road in the north, Transmitter Road to the east, Eckarts Road to the west with the Bunya Highway passing through.

Tingoora Provisional School opened on 20 January 1908. On 1 January 1909, it became Tingoora State School.

On 3 April 1921, St George's Anglican Church was dedicated by Edward Castell Osborn, Archdeacon of Toowoomba. It closed on 23 December 1962 and the church building was relocated to Proston where it is used as a church hall behind the Shepherd Memorial Anglican Church of St Peter.

Burrandowan State School opened circa May 1923. It closed circa 1943.

== Demographics ==
In the 2006 census, the locality of Tingoora had a population of 175 people.

In the 2016 census, the locality of Tingoora had a population of 273 people.

In the 2021 census, the locality of Tingoora had a population of 272 people.

== Education ==
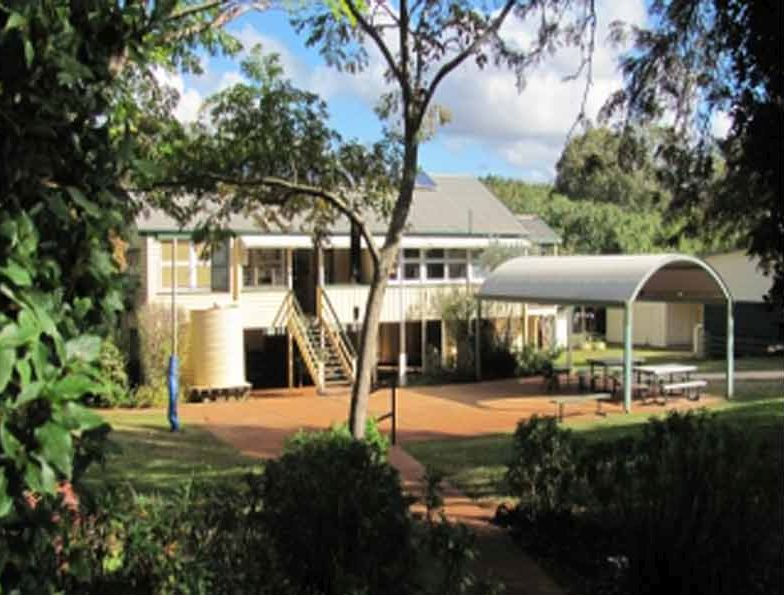
Tingoora State School, 2020

Tingoora State School is a government primary (Prep–6) school for boys and girls at 6 Main Street (26.3629°S 151.8195°E). In 2018, the school had an enrolment of 33 students with 3 teachers and 7 non-teaching staff (3 full-time equivalent).

There are no secondary schools in Tingoora. The nearest government secondary schools are Wondai State School (to Year 10) in neighbouring Wondai to the north-east, Murgon State High School (to Year 12) in Murgon to the north-east, and Kingaroy State High School (to Year 12) in Kingaroy to the south-east.

== Attractions ==
The Kilkivan to Kingaroy Rail Trail follows the old railway line between the two towns. It is 88 kilometres (55 mi) long and passes through Goomeri, Murgon, Wondai, Tingoora, Wooroolin, Memerambi, and Crawford. The trail from Kilkivan to Murgon is unsealed. Queensland's first and longest sealed rail trail section of 44 kilometres (27 mi) from Murgon to Kingaroy is for walkers and cyclists only. Short distances between towns means coffee is never far away. The trail crosses Dingo Creek on the outskirts of Wondai and again on the outskirts of Tingoora. Most creeks are crossed via timber bridges or concrete causeways, the most notable of which is the restored curved trestle railway bridge at the rural town of Tingoora.
