= Proston =

- Town
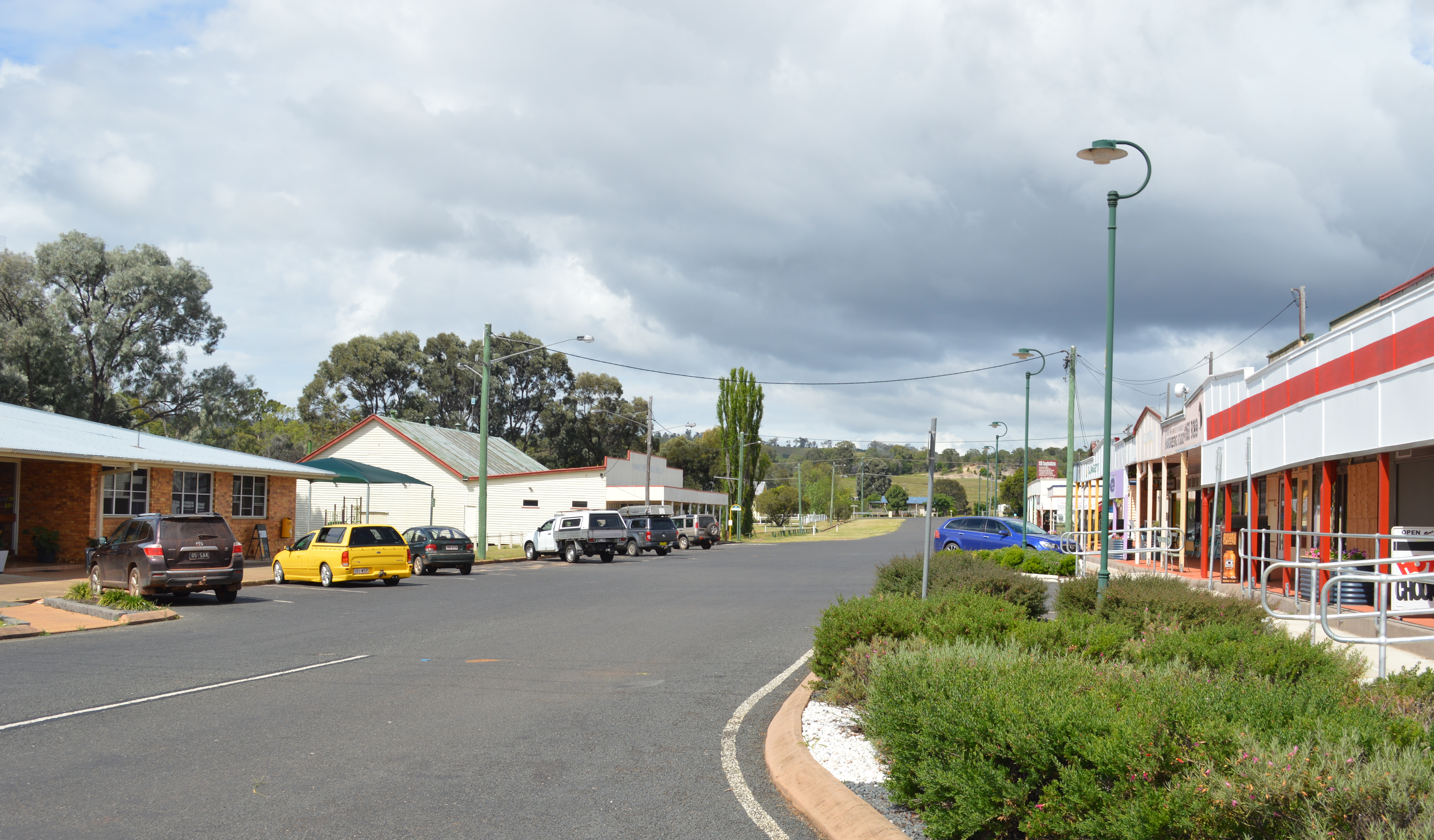
- Blake St, the main street of Proston

- Interactive map of Proston
- Coordinates: 26.1647°S 151.6027°E
- Country: Australia
- State: Queensland
- LGA: South Burnett Region
- Location: 40.2 km (25.0 mi) NW of Wondai; 65.7 km (40.8 mi) NW of Kingaroy; 219 km (136 mi) N of Toowoomba; 295 km (183 mi) NW of Brisbane

Government
  - State electorate: Nanango
  - Federal division: Flynn

Area
  - Total: 46.1 km^{2} (17.8 sq mi)
- Elevation: 368 m (1,207 ft)

Population
  - Total: 410 (2021 census)
  - Density: 8.89/km^{2} (23.03/sq mi)
- Time zone: UTC+10:00 (AEST)
- Postcode: 4613
Localities around Proston
Okeden	Stalworth	Kinleymore
Okeden	Proston	Kinleymore
Okeden	Melrose	Melrose

Proston is a rural town and locality in the South Burnett Region, Queensland, Australia. In the 2021 census, the locality of Proston had a population of 410 people.

== Geography ==
The town is located 280 kilometres (170 mi) north-west of the state capital, Brisbane 50 kilometres (31 mi) northwest of the South Burnett regions commercial centre, Kingaroy and 20 kilometres (12 mi) south of Lake Boondooma. It is the closest supporting township to Lake Boondooma and has a variety of shops including post office, grocery store (SPAR), pub (Golden Spurs), chemist, medical centre, hardware, cafe, and clothing store. The area around Proston is hilly, grassland, grazing country, most of it cleared from the original brigalow scrub that once covered the immediate vicinity.

== History ==
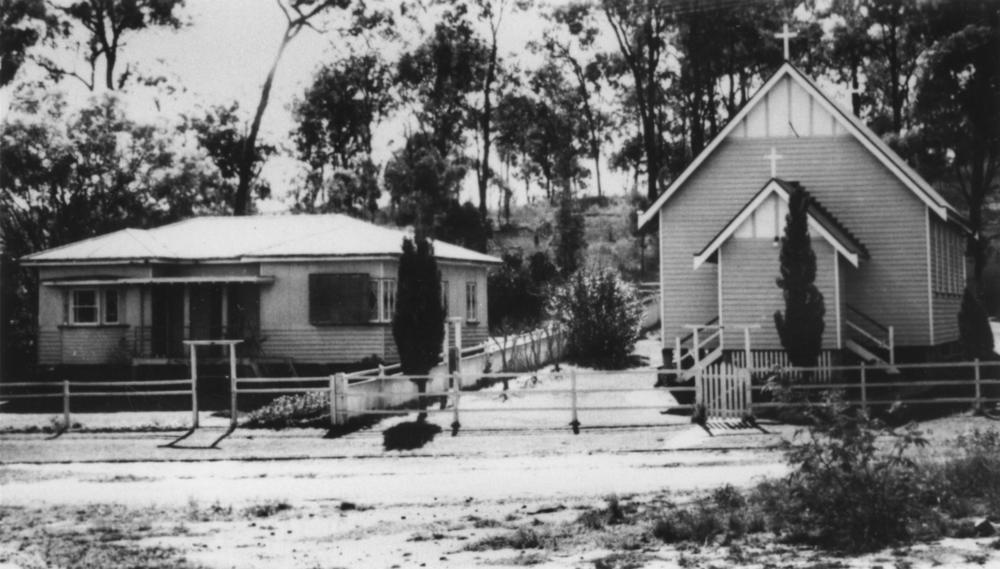
Proston Lutheran Church, ca. 1954

The town's name is taken from a pastoral run name, which in turn was a corruption of an Aboriginal word (possibly from the Waka language) meaning kurrajong tree.

The surrounding rural area was settled in 1910 with a land ballot that attracted a group of settlers from England. With little access to water, early settlers struggled to maintain a living from the land. The coming of the railway in 1923 eased some of the early hardships and was the impetus for the establishment of the township. Prior to this time, Hivesville was the main service centre for the district. The construction of the South Burnett Dairy Co-operative Butter Factory in 1934 led to even more growth.

Some of the original settlers in the district included John and Percy Slinger, George Perkins, W. Perkins, C. Perkins, H. Perkins, R. Potter, E. Hird, A. Taylor, George Hatchett, W.T.B. Hatchett, Reuben (John) Bull, E. Dowell, H. Olsen, S. Porter, A. Chesterton, A. Harper, C. Harper, M. Comerford, J. Walton, M. McGovern, R. Glanville, E. Cridland, H. Nairne, W. Waters, E. Murgatroyd, S. Sunderland, A. Ley, J. Kinnear, D. Morey, W. Welch, E. York, C. Rees, R. Bracken, J. Donkersley, J. Wardill, J. Grace, H. Holdsworth, H. Crick. P. Henry, T. Marriott, S. Shaw, and Harry Flynn. These first settlers, took up uncleared selections of virgin bush, with most between 300 and 350 acres in size. The price was seventeen shillings and sixpence an acre, payable to the Queensland Lands Department over thirty-three years in annual installments, at an interest rate of three percent. Initially the bush and scrub was cleared and then corn and Rhodes grass planted. Income was generated through dairying, with the cream being sent by rail to Maryborough in the earliest years and later to Murgon. Excess milk was fed to pigs which generated further income and calves from the cows were also sold. Corn was the most regular crop. The system was viable, but only just, and there were many hard years.

Proston Provisional School (also known as the Proston Construction Camp School) opened on 9 July 1917 to provide schooling for the children of the workers constructing the Proston railway line. It closed on 31 July 1918 and operated out of a tent along various locations along the railway line as it was constructed and gradually moved west. Although named Proston, this first school name reflects the name of the railway line than its actual location. It is believed this early school may have been closer to present day Hivesville than present day Proston.

Nearby schools were also established at Brigooda (1925-1965), Durong South (1925-present), Boondooma (aka Boondooma West, 1939–1968), Boondooma (was known as Durong State School until 1976, 1923–1999), Hivesville (1924-1968), Kinleymore (1913-1969), Speedwell (1912-1963), and Abbeywood (1914-1969). There was no school at Stalworth, however that district became known for a local hall where dances and social functions were held and there was also a butter factory there for a short time as well.

The current Proston State School opened on 24 July 1924 as a primary school. In 1965, it expanded to include secondary education to Year 10. In 1977, it expanded to include a preschool.

Shepherd Memorial Anglican Church of St Peter was dedicated on 3 March 1939 by the Most Reverend John William Charles Wand. In 1969 St George's Anglican Church was relocated from Tingoora to the Proston to serve as the St Peter's Church Hall. St George's had operated in Tingoora from 1921 to 1962. The hall is located behind the church on a different allotment. St Peter's closure in November 2015 was approved by Bishop Cameron Venables.

In 1967, the Speedwell Baptist Church (both the building and the congregation) relocated to Proston. The church originally opened in Speedwell on Sunday 16 April 1916.

The closure of the railway line and Butter Factory in the 1970s threw the area into a long period of slow decline.

The creation of the nearby Boondooma Dam in the 1970s by damming the Boyne River, created Lake Boondooma which provided a source of water for Tarong Power Station and supplies water to Proston and other regional towns.

The Proston public library opened in 1994.

== Demographics ==
In the 2006 census, the town of Proston had a population of 304 people.

In the 2016 census, the locality of Proston had a population of 379 people.

In the 2021 census, the locality of Proston had a population of 410 people.

== Heritage listings ==
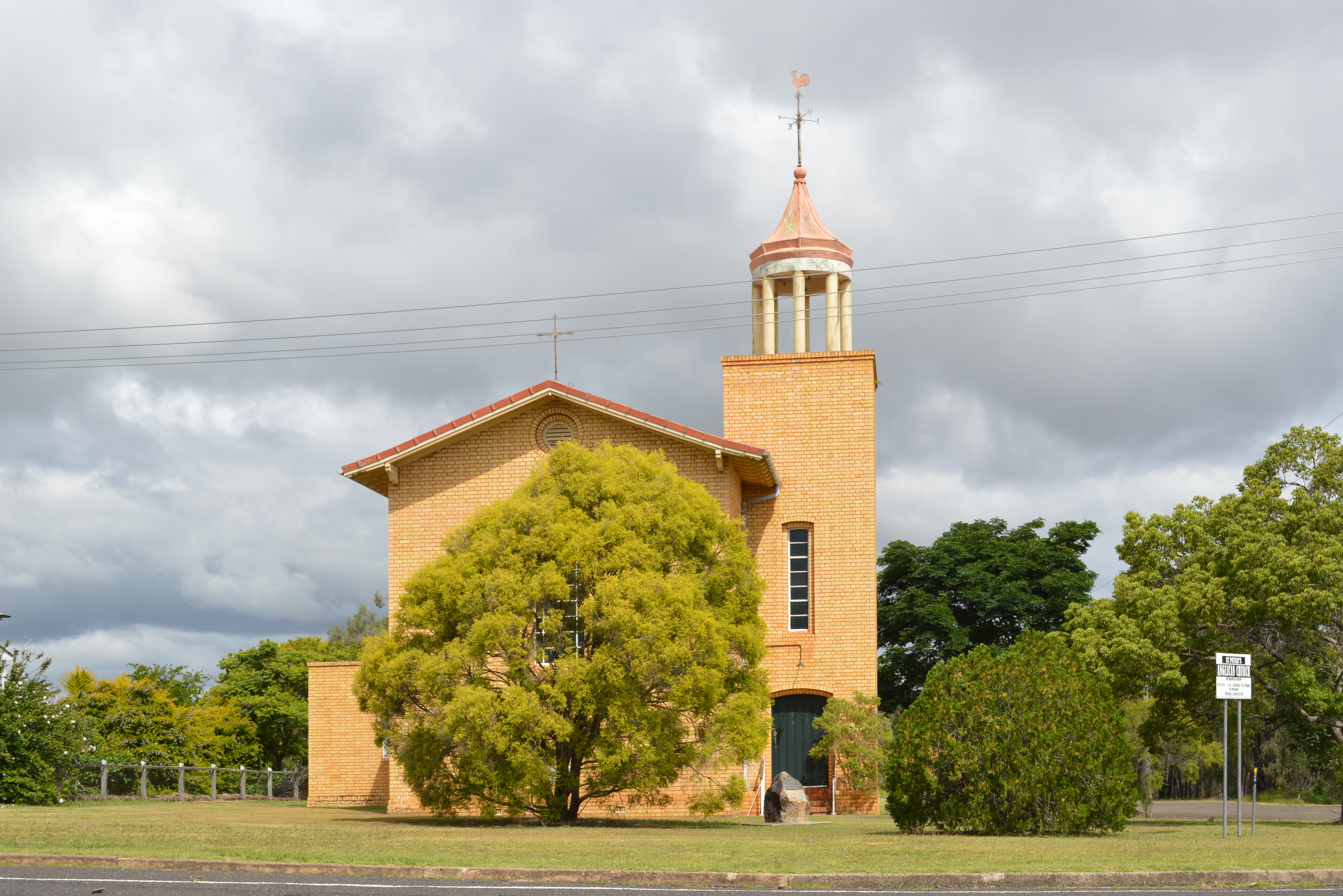
Shepherd Memorial Church of St Peter, 2017

Proston has a number of heritage-listed sites, including:

- former Shepherd Memorial Church of St Peter, corner of Drake Street and Wondai Road (26.1607°S 151.6011°E)

== Economy ==
The main agricultural activities in the Proston area are dairying, beef cattle and duboisia, a shrub used in the production of the drug butylscopolamine.

== Education ==
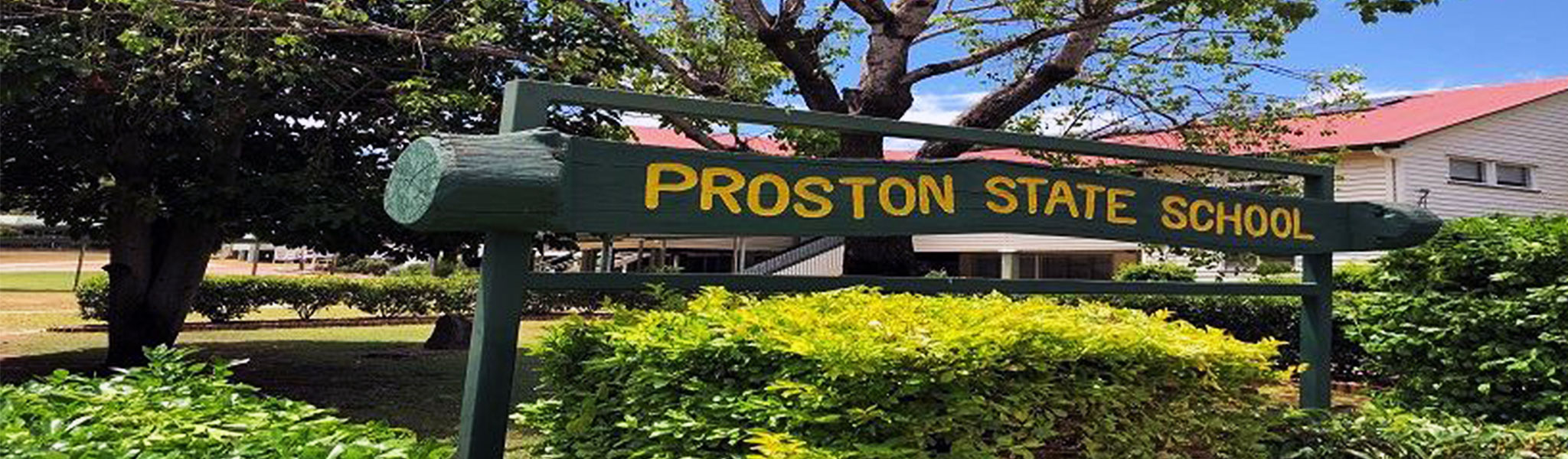
Proston State School, 2024

Proston State School is a government primary and secondary (Prep–10) school for boys and girls at 94 Rodney Street (26.1677°S 151.6001°E). In 2017, the school had an enrolment of 114 students with 14 teachers (13 full-time equivalent) and 16 non-teaching staff (8 full-time equivalent).

The nearest government secondary school for Years 11 and 12 is Murgon State High School in Murgon to the east.

== Facilities ==
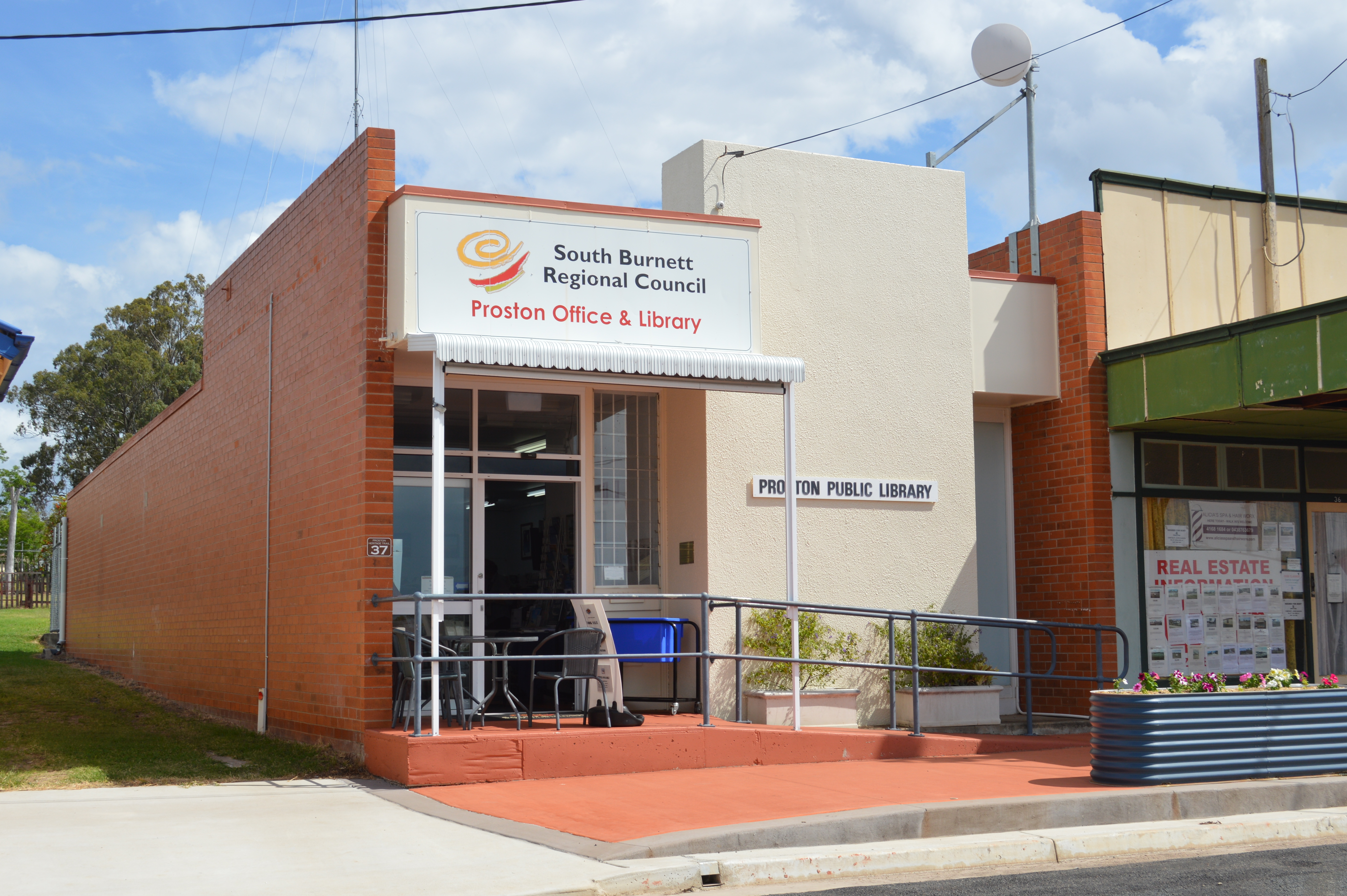
Proston Public Library, 2017

Proston has a hotel, convenience store (SPAR), café, post office, hardware, police station, ambulance and voluntary fire brigade service. It also has tennis, golf and bowling clubs, a swimming pool and library. Other facilities include a medical centre and ambulance service, the Proston Rural Fire Brigade, and the Proston Transfer Station.

The South Burnett Regional Council operates a library in Proston at 34 Blake Street.

== Community groups ==
The town is also serviced by Proston Meals on Wheels. There is also an active scout group.

The Proston branch of the Queensland Country Women's Association meets at the CWA hall at 37 Rodney Street.

== Sport and recreation ==
The area is well catered for with sports facilities and clubs. There is the nine-hole Proston Golf Club on the western edge of town. Proston's Lawn Bowls Club and the Over 50's group are also popular amongst the locals. Social tennis is held every Thursday night at the tennis grounds, Wondai Road. The locals have dances every week at the Public Hall.

== Attractions ==
The hilliness of the terrain provides striking panoramic views of the area at several points along the main road.

Lake Boondooma is located 20 kilometres (12 mi) northwest of the township. For fishing, the dam is stocked with Australian bass, golden perch (yellowbelly), silver perch and saratoga. There is also a naturally occurring population of eel-tailed catfish (Jew) and spangled perch. Visitors to the dam can also waterski, sail and swim. For quieter fishing and canoeing, Proston Weir is located just south of the town. The weir doesn't provide toilet facilities or picnic tables. A Stocked Impoundment Permit is needed to fish Lake Boondooma. The dam offers caravan, camping, bunkhouse and cabin accommodation on the lake's foreshores along with tennis courts, modern amenities blocks, a central kiosk and extensive landscaped picnic and BBQ areas.

An unusual attraction in Proston is Sidcup Castle. The "castle" comprises seventeen rooms, five of which are hexagonal. The entire structure was built from second hand materials by Harold Douglas and designed as an exact replica of his childhood home in Sidcup, Kent.

== Events ==
In February each year, anglers compete for more than $4,500 in prizes in the Boondooma Yellowbelly Fishing Competition.

The Proston Show and Campdraft is held every March at the Showgrounds just on the western outskirts of town.

The Proston Car Rally club holds a rally every three months on their track, 7 kilometres (4.3 mi) west of Proston on private property. The family weekends include time trials, various classes. Free camping is provided. Manar Park is an off-road park for 4x4s, dirt bikes, quads and buggies, situated on a large cattle station north-east of Boondooma Homestead. Accessible along Manar Road the park does have camping facilities.
