= Wondai =

- Town
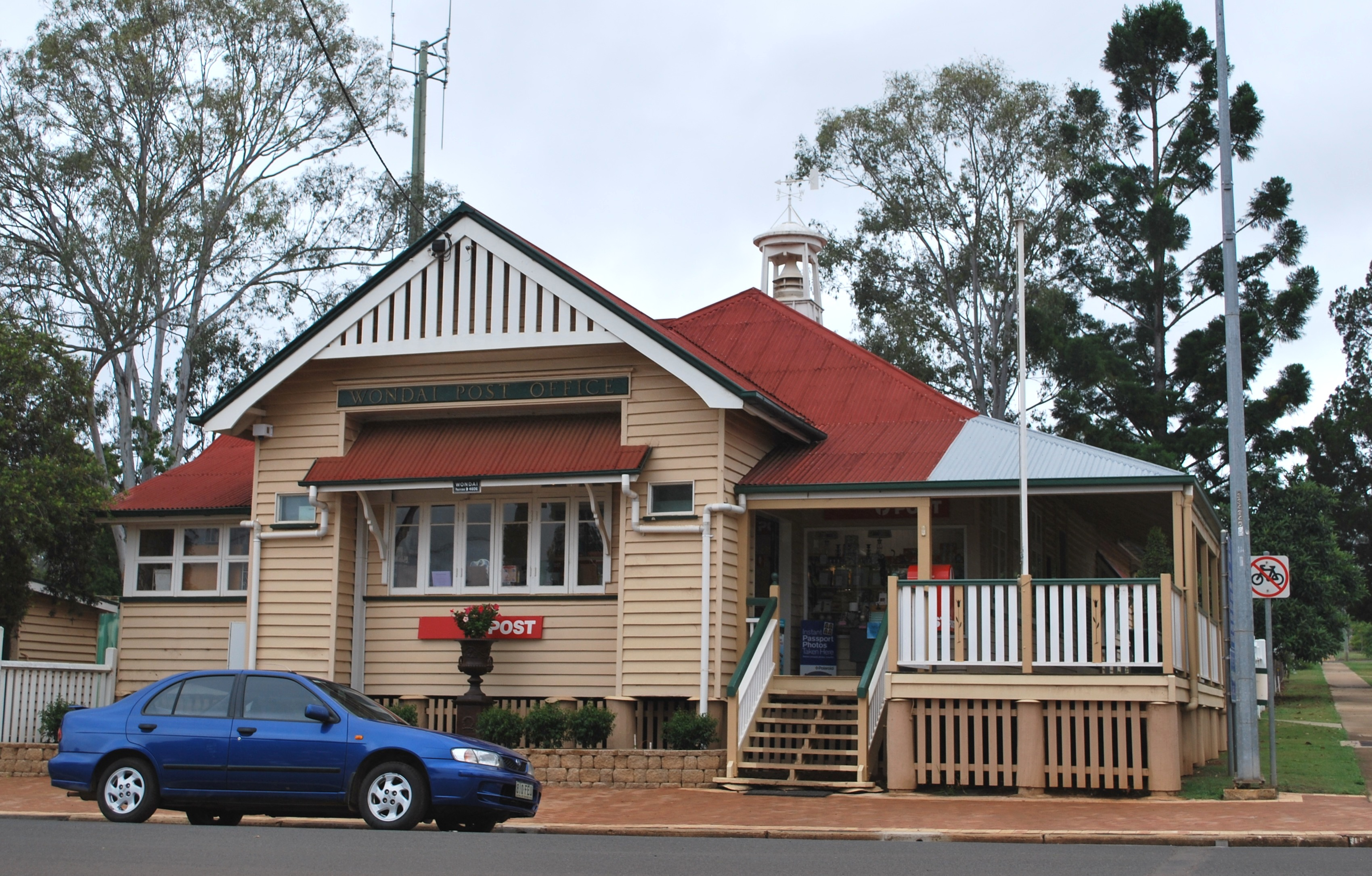
- Wondai Post Office

- Interactive map of Wondai
- Coordinates: 26.3183°S 151.8736°E
- Country: Australia
- State: Queensland
- LGA: South Burnett Region
- Location: 15.7 km (9.8 mi) SE of Murgon; 29.5 km (18.3 mi) N of Kingaroy; 185 km (115 mi) N of Toowoomba; 247 km (153 mi) NW of Brisbane

Government
  - State electorate: Nanango
  - Federal division: Flynn

Area
  - Total: 40.0 km^{2} (15.4 sq mi)
- Elevation: 321 m (1,053 ft)

Population
  - Total: 1,975 (2021 census)
  - Density: 49.38/km^{2} (127.88/sq mi)
- Time zone: UTC+10:00 (AEST)
- Postcode: 4606
Localities around Wondai
Chelmsford	Wheatlands	Ficks Crossing
Greenview	Wondai	Cherbourg
Tingoora	Charlestown	Charlestown

Wondai (/wɒndaɪ/) is a rural town and locality in the South Burnett Region, Queensland, Australia. In the 2021 census, the locality of Wondai had a population of 1,975 people.

== Geography ==
Wondai is located to the south of the Bunya Highway, 241 kilometres (150 mi) north west of the state capital, Brisbane.

== History ==
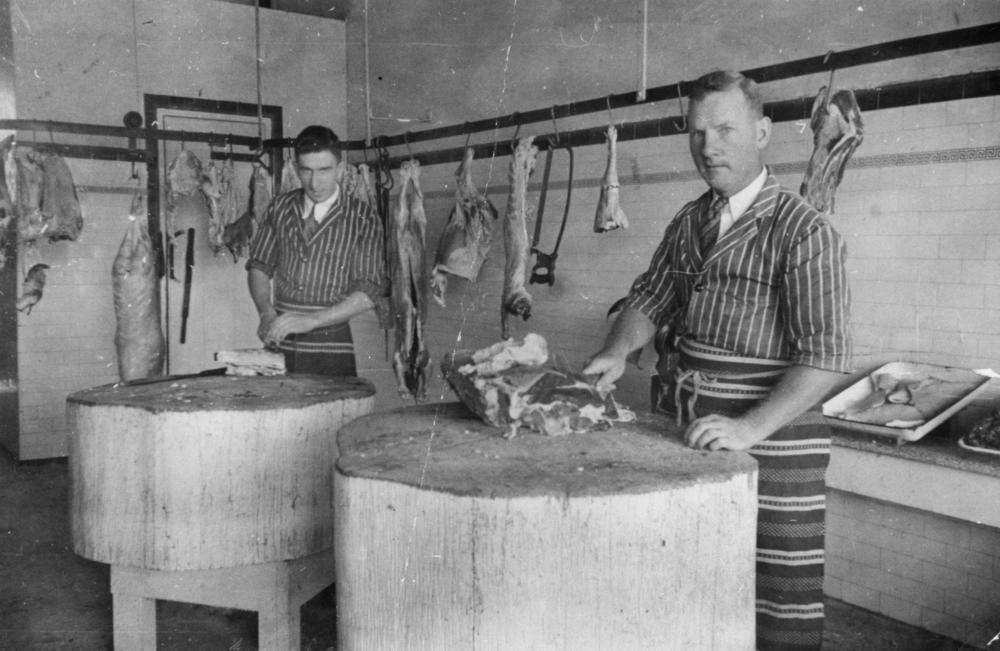
Butcher shop in Wondai, 1935

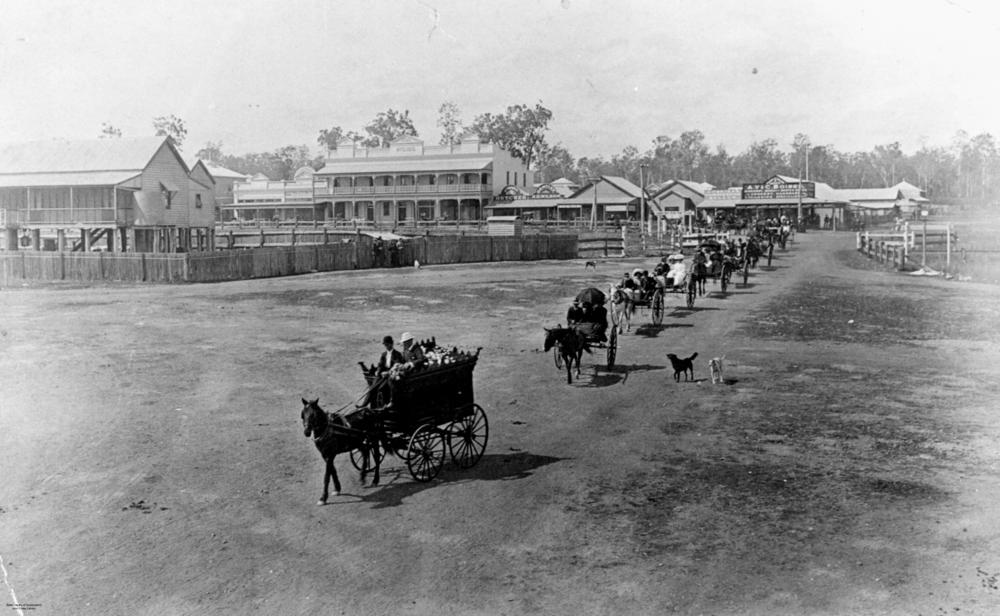
A funeral procession in Wondai, ca. 1915

The name Wondai is believed to be an aboriginal word from the Wakawaka language derived from either watya meaning dingo (a native dog) or wandar meaning nape of the neck.

Wondai was first settled in the 1850s and closer settlement took place in the early 1900s.

Wondai Provisional School opened on 2 May 1905. On 1 January 1909, it became Wondai State School. A secondary department was added in 1964.

Wondai Methodist Church opened on Sunday 4 October 1908, being replaced by the current church building on 9 August 1914. When the Methodist Church amalgamated into the Uniting Church in Australia in 1977, it became Wondai Uniting Church.

In December 1912, a Baptist church opened in Wondai.

St Mary's Anglican Church was dedicated on Thursday 21 September 1939 by Archbishop William Wand. It replaced an earlier church.

Wondai Presbyterian Church opened in 1941.

St John-Trinity Lutheran Church was built from timber in 1950. In 1964, St John's Lutheran Church in Mondure was relocated to Wondai to become the church hall for St John-Trinity Lutheran church.

On Sunday 31 January 1954, Archbishop James Duhig opened the St John the Baptist Primary Catholic School in Wondai. It was operated the Presentation Sisters who already operated a convent school in Murgon. The school was always small with only two or three teachers serving there. In January 1968 it was decided that the two teachers should travel by car from the Murgon convent each day rather than operate a separate convent in Wondai. With student numbers falling below 30 and the Murgon Catholic School being only 9 miles (14 km) away, the St John's school closed at the end of 1969.

== Demographics ==
In the 2006 census, the town of Wondai had a population of 1,402 people.

In the 2011 census, the locality of Wondai had a population of 2,127 people.

In the 2016 census, the locality of Wondai had a population of 1,973 people.

In the 2021 census, the locality of Wondai had a population of 1,975 people.

== Economy ==
Important industries include beef, dairy, grains and duboisia, used in the production of the antispasmodic drug butylscopolamine. Growing in importance is the wine industry.

== Education ==
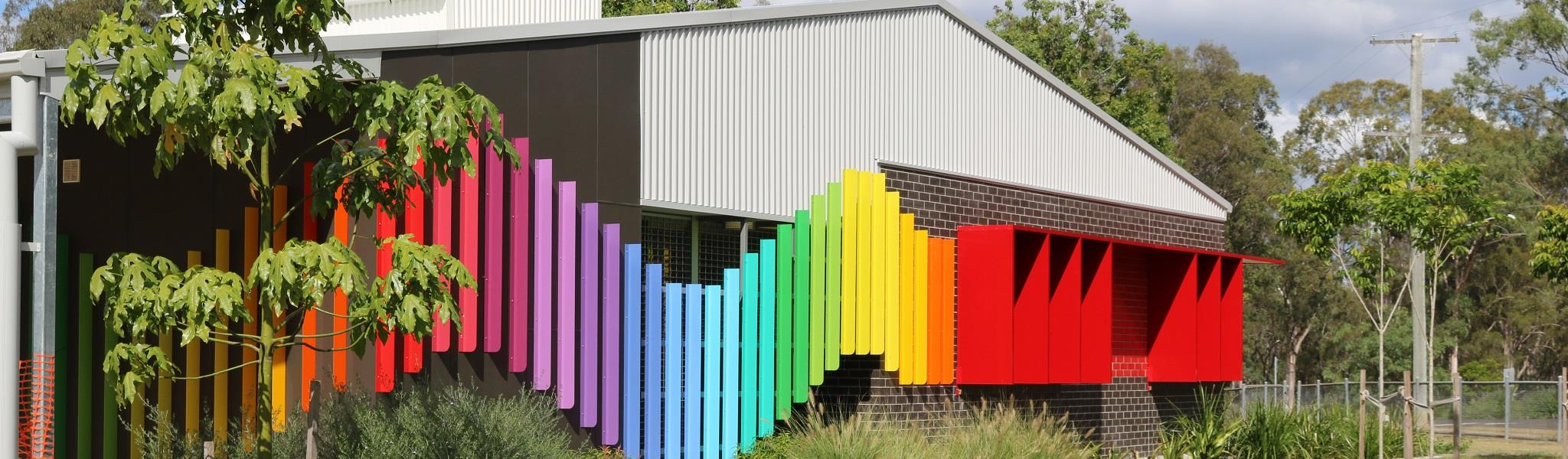
Wondai State School, 2024

Wondai State School is a government primary and secondary (Prep–9) school for boys and girls at 32 Kent Street (26.3207°S 151.8821°E). In 2018, the school had an enrolment of 162 students with 20 teachers (18 full-time equivalent) and 17 non-teaching staff (13 full-time equivalent). It includes a special education program.

For secondary education to Year 12, the nearest government schools are Murgon State High School in Murgon to the north-west or Kingaroy State High School in Kingaroy to the south.

== Amenities ==
The South Burnett Regional Council operates a library in Wondai. The Wondai library building opened in 1962 and is located at 78 Mackenzie Street.

The Wondai branch of the Queensland Country Women's Association meets at 86 McKenzie Street.

St Mary's Anglican Church is at 32 Baynes Street (26.3198°S 151.8765°E).

St John the Baptist Catholic Church is at 52-54 Bramston Street (26.32076°S 151.87814°E).

Wondai Uniting Church (formerly Wondai Methodist Church) is at 56 Pring Street.

Wondai Baptist Church is at 48 Cadell Street.

St Andrew's Presbyterian Church is at 38 Pring Street.

St John-Trinity Lutheran Church is at 37 Edward Street (26.31532°S 151.8743°E).

== Attractions ==
Wondai Heritage Museum is at 80 Mackenzie Street (26.3191°S 151.8731°E).

== Notable residents ==
Notable people from Wondai include

- Australian Test cricketers Carl Rackemann and Nathan Hauritz.
- Country music artist/comedian Chad Morgan
- Comedian, writer and Australian Greens candidate for Richmond, Mandy Nolan

Wondai was also home to the legendary pacer Wondai's Mate.
