= Wattle Camp =

- Suburb
- Interactive map of Wattle Camp
- Coordinates: 26.4566°S 151.9677°E
- Country: Australia
- State: Queensland
- LGA: South Burnett Region
- Location: 20.6 km (12.8 mi) NE of Kingaroy; 166 km (103 mi) N of Toowoomba; 214 km (133 mi) NW of Brisbane

Government
  - State electorate: Nanango
  - Federal division: Maranoa

Area
  - Total: 73.5 km^{2} (28.4 sq mi)

Population
  - Total: 543 (2021 census)
  - Density: 7.388/km^{2} (19.134/sq mi)
- Time zone: UTC+10:00 (AEST)
- Postcode: 4615
Suburbs around Wattle Camp
Charlestown	Charlestown	Wyalla
Corndale	Wattle Camp	Sandy Ridges
Booie	Booie	Sandy Ridges

Wattle Camp is a rural locality in the South Burnett Region, Queensland, Australia. In the 2021 census, Wattle Camp had a population of 543 people.

== Geography ==
The Wondai State Forest is in the west of the locality.

There is a rural residential area in the north and east of the locality. Apart from these, the predominant land use is grazing on native vegetation.

== History ==
Holbrook State School operated in the Wattle Camp area briefly between 1895 and 1897. It was at one point a half-time school shared with Booie State School, under teacher Miss Mary Jane McNicol (who later became Mrs. Perret of Booie - a resident there for many years).

== Demographics ==
In the 2016 census, Wattle Camp had a population of 517 people.

In the 2021 census, Wattle Camp had a population of 543 people.

== Education ==
There are no schools in Wattle Camp. The nearest government primary schools are:

- Tingoora State School in Tingoora to the north-west
- Moffatdale State School in Moffatdale to the north
- Coolabunia State School in Coolabunia to the south
- Crawford State School in Crawford to the south-west
- Wooroolin State School in Wooroolin to the west

The nearest government secondary schools are Wondai State School (to Year 9) in Wondai to the north-west and Kingaroy State High School (to Year 12) in Kingaroy to south-west.
