= South Burnett =

Coordinates: 26°32′27.4″S 151°50′22″E

South Burnett Queensland
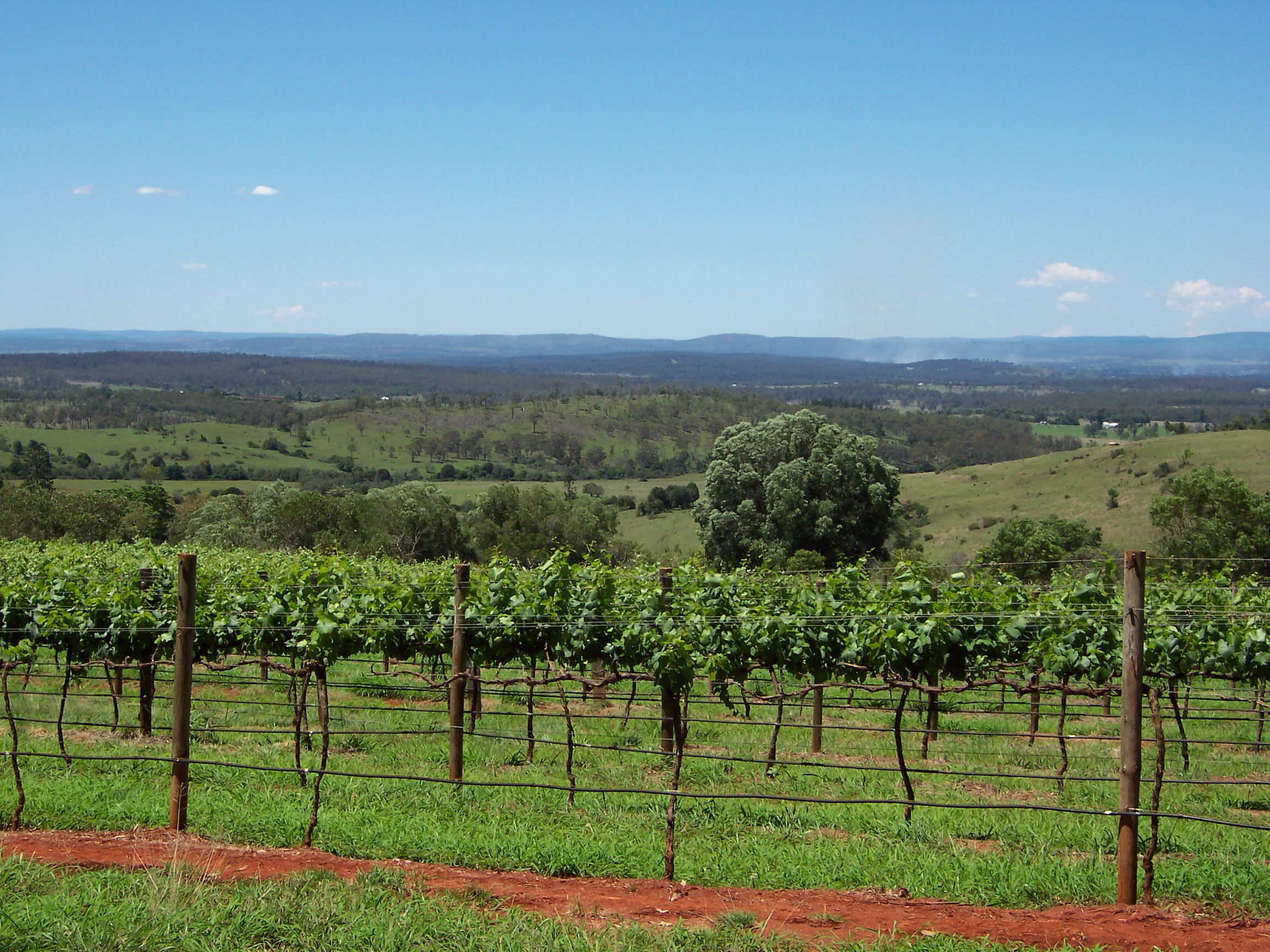
- The rich soils of the region support a thriving agricultural industry
- Population: 31,286 (2007)
  - Density: 3.72497/km^{2} (9.6476/sq mi)
- Area: 8,399 km^{2} (3,242.9 sq mi)
- LGA(s): South Burnett Region; Gympie Region
- Federal division(s): Blair; Maranoa

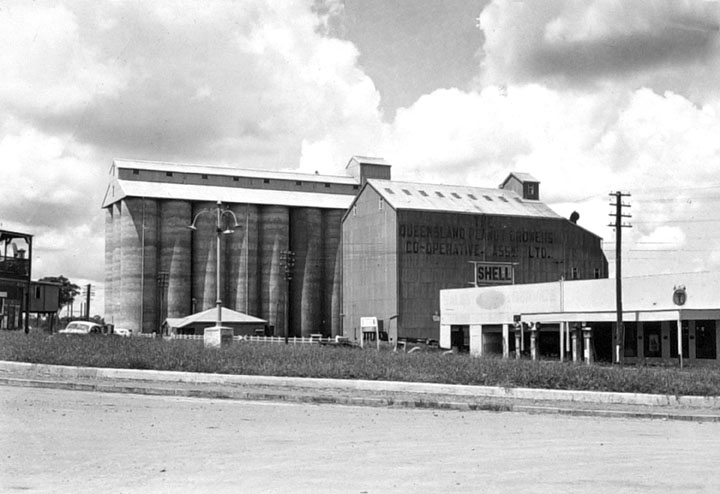
Peanut silos, 1945

The South Burnett is a peanut growing and wine-producing area on the Great Dividing Range, north of the Darling Downs, in Queensland. It is with the basin of the Burnett River. The area is within two local government areas, South Burnett Region and Gympie Region.

== Towns ==
Towns located within this region with a population of more than 1,000 include Kingaroy, Murgon, Wondai and Nanango. Towns with a population under 1,000 people include Kilkivan, Goomeri, Proston, Blackbutt, Kumbia, Tingoora, Hivesville, Memerambi, Wooroolin, Moffatdale, Crawford, Coolabunia, Mount Mowbullan, Goodger, Booie, Benarkin, Cloyna and Wheatlands.

== Transport ==
The D'Aguilar Highway leads south east, while the Bunya Highway enters the region from the south west. The Wide Bay Highway connects to Gympie and the Bruce Highway towards the coast and the Burnett Highway continues north of the region.

The Brisbane Valley railway line reached Blackbutt in 1905. The line was closed in the 1993.

== Wine region ==
The South Burnett Wine Region is another attraction, with Verdelho grown successfully, due to the warm climate and rich soils. With around ten wineries, it is a relatively new wine region. Grapes were first planted in the area in 1898. Industrial production began in 1993. Most of the wineries are located close to Kingaroy or in the Moffatdale area north of Murgon. There are none in the west of the region. Shiraz and Chardonnay are the most prevalent varieties with production roughly halved between red and white wines.

== Attractions ==
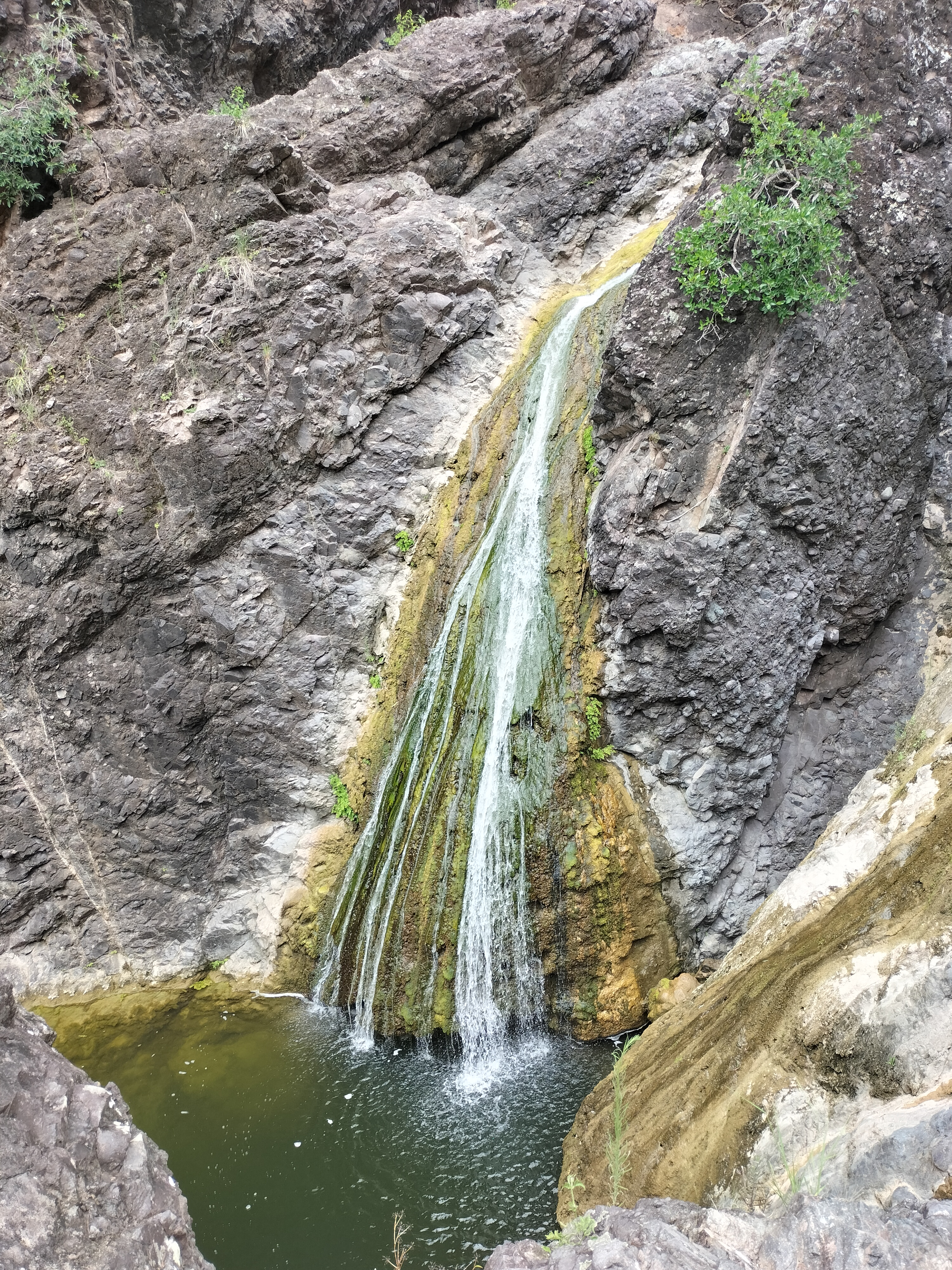
Kinbombi Falls

One of the best known attractions in the area is the peanut-growing district centered on Kingaroy. 12 kilometres (7.5 mi) from Murgon is the Bjelke-Petersen Dam. Other dams in the region include Gordonbrook Dam and Boondooma Dam. Tarong Power Station and the Tarong National Park are both in the south of the Burnett. The Bunya Mountains, protected within the Bunya Mountains National Park, which contains the largest natural bunya pine forest in the world, are a popular natural attraction in the south of the region. At Kinbombi Falls there are picnic and camping facilities next to a large waterfall, gorge and rocky creek. Rock-wallabies can be seen on local cliffs, particularly around twilight hours. Garnet gem fields are found just west of Proston.

== See also ==
- Regions of Queensland
- Wide Bay–Burnett
