= Johnstown, Queensland =

Johnstown
- Suburb
- Interactive map of Johnstown
- Coordinates: 26.4011°S 152.115°E
- Country: Australia
- State: Queensland
- LGAs: South Burnett Region; Gympie Region
- Location: 33.2 km (20.6 mi) NE of Nanango; 42.0 km (26.1 mi) SE of Murgon; 43.5 km (27.0 mi) ENE of Kingaroy; 113 km (70 mi) SW of Gympie; 189 km (117 mi) NNW of Brisbane

Government
  - State electorate: Nanango
  - Federal divisions: Maranoa; Wide Bay

Area
  - Total: 110.6 km^{2} (42.7 sq mi)

Population
  - Total: 46 (2021 census)
  - Density: 0.416/km^{2} (1.077/sq mi)
- Time zone: UTC+10:00 (AEST)
- Postcode: 4615
Suburbs around Johnstown
Barambah	Barambah	Elgin Vale
Charlestown	Johnstown	Elgin Vale
Wyalla	Wyalla	Mount Stanley

Johnstown is a rural locality split between the South Burnett Region and the Gympie Region, both in Queensland, Australia. In the 2021 census, Johnstown had a population of 46 people.

== Geography ==
Barker Creek (which flows north into Lake Barambah) forms part of the western boundary.

The Burnett Highway enters the locality from the north-west (Barambah) and exits to the south-west (Wyalla).

The land use is predominantly grazing on native vegetation.

== History ==
The locality name is derived from a pastoral run held in 1854 by John Stephen Ferriter. The run is shown on an 1872 map of Southern Queensland, south of the Stephenton run which was also held by Ferriter, suggesting the names of the runs derive from Ferriter's given names.

Johnstown Provisional School opened on 27 March 1916 and closed on 1 September 1924. It reopened on 18 April 1933 and closed on 20 February 1935. It was on the western side of Johnstown Road (approx 26.43474°S 152.12585°E).

Johnstown West Provisional School opened on 4 July 1938. On 22 October 1952, it became Johnstown West State School. It closed on 7 July 1967. It was on the western side of Barker Creek, which is one of the watercourses now impounded by the construction of the Bjelke-Petersen Dam, inundating land in this area. However, the school's land parcel is still in existence at 1 Forestry Road, Charlestown (26.41127°S 152.02283°E).

== Demographics ==
In the 2016 census, Johnstown had a population of 30 people.

In the 2021 census, Johnstown had a population of 46 people.

== Education ==
There are no schools in Johnstown. The nearest government primary schools are Moffatdale State School in Moffatdale to the north-west and Nanango State School in Nanango to the south. The nearest government secondary schools are Murgon State High School in Murgon to the north-west, Goomeri State School (to Year 10) in Goomeri to the north, and Nanango State High School (to Year 12) in Nanango to the south.
