= Mount Stanley, Queensland =

Mount Stanley
- Suburb
- Interactive map of Mount Stanley
- Coordinates: 26.6066°S 152.2011°E
- Country: Australia
- State: Queensland
- LGA: Somerset Region
- Location: 72.5 km (45.0 mi) SW of Kingaroy; 90.9 km (56.5 mi) E of Nanango; 161 km (100 mi) NW of Brisbane

Government
  - State electorate: Nanango
  - Federal division: Blair

Area
  - Total: 386.2 km^{2} (149.1 sq mi)

Population
  - Total: 11 (2021 census)
  - Density: 0.0285/km^{2} (0.074/sq mi)
- Time zone: UTC+10:00 (AEST)
- Postcode: 4314
Suburbs around Mount Stanley
Wyalla; Johnstown	Elgin Vale	Manumbar
Runnymede; Bullcamp	Mount Stanley	Kingaham
East Nanango	Avoca Vale	Avoca Vale

Mount Stanley is a rural locality in the Somerset Region, Queensland, Australia. In the 2021 census, Mount Stanley had a population of 11 people.

== Geography ==
The locality is loosely bounded to the west and north by the Brisbane Range.

Mount Stanley has the following mountains:

- Mount Gibbarnee (26.5601°S 152.2470°E) 426 metres (1,398 ft) above sea level in the north-east of the locality.
- Mount Stanley (26.6480°S 152.2096°E) 522 metres (1,713 ft) in the south-east of the locality.

The east branch of Brisbane River flows from the north-east of the locality through to the south of locality. Mount Stanley is often described as the source of the Brisbane River.

== History ==
The locality may take its name from the mountain Mount Stanley. Alternately, it may take its name from the pastoral leases called Mount Stanley.

Mount Stanley East and Mount Stanley West were two of the six leases that comprised the pastoral run of Colinton which was "bounded on the north by a marked tree beyond Mount Stanley". Colinton was taken up by the Balfour brothers (John, Charles and Robert) in 1841.

On 1 February 2018, Mount Stanley's postcode changed from 4306 to 4314.

== Demographics ==
In the 2016 census, Mount Stanley had a population of 7 people.

In the 2021 census, Mount Stanley had a population of 11 people.

== Education ==
There are no schools in Mount Stanley. The nearest government primary schools are Linville State School in Linville to the south, Nanango State School in Nanango to the south-west, Moffatdale State School in Moffatdale to the north-west, and Mary Valley State College in Imbil to the north-east. The nearest government secondary schools are Nanango State High School (to Year 12) in Nanango to the south-west, Toogoolawah State High School in Toogoolawah to the south, and Mary Valley State College (to Year 10 only) in Imbil to the north-east.
