= Wyalla, Queensland =

Wyalla
- Suburb
- Interactive map of Wyalla
- Coordinates: 26.4622°S 152.0761°E
- Country: Australia
- State: Queensland
- LGA: South Burnett Region
- Location: 24.9 km (15.5 mi) NNE of Nanango; 29.7 km (18.5 mi) ENE of Kingaroy; 34.9 km (21.7 mi) SSE of Murgon; 221 km (137 mi) NW of Brisbane

Government
  - State electorate: Nanango
  - Federal division: Maranoa

Area
  - Total: 76.7 km^{2} (29.6 sq mi)

Population
  - Total: 43 (2021 census)
  - Density: 0.561/km^{2} (1.452/sq mi)
- Time zone: UTC+10:00 (AEST)
- Postcode: 4615
Suburbs around Wyalla
Charlestown	Johnstown	Johnstown
Wattle Camp	Wyalla	Johnstown
Sandy Ridges	Runnymede	Mount Stanley

Wyalla is a rural locality in the South Burnett Region, Queensland, Australia. In the 2021 census, Wyalla had a population of 43 people.

== Geography ==
The upper reaches of Lake Barambah are in the north-west corner. Barker Creek flows through the locality into Lake Barambah.

The Burnett Highway enters the locality from the north (Johnstown) and exits to the south-west (Sandy Ridges).

The land use is predominantly grazing on native vegetation with some crop growing.

== Demographics ==
In the 2016 census, Wyalla had a population of 37 people.

In the 2021 census, Wyalla had a population of 43 people.

== Education ==
There are no schools in Wyalla. The nearest government primary schools are Moffatdale State School in Moffatdale to the north and Nanango State School in Nanango to the south. The nearest government secondary schools are Nanango State High School (to Year 12) in Nanago to the south, Wondai State School (to Year 10) in Wondai to the north-west, and Murgon State High School (to Year 12) in Murgon to the north-west.
