= Booie, Queensland =

Booie
- Suburb
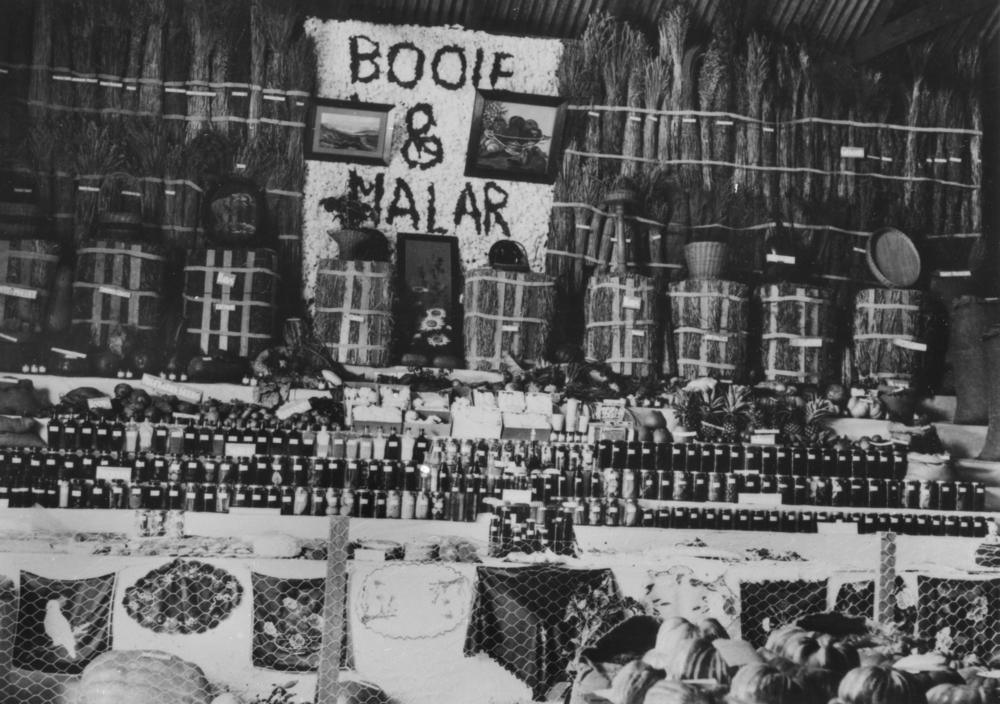
- Booie and Malar districts exhibition at Kingaroy Show, 1936

- Interactive map of Booie
- Coordinates: 26.5333°S 151.9333°E
- Country: Australia
- State: Queensland
- City: Kingaroy
- LGA: South Burnett Region
- Location: 12.6 km (7.8 mi) E of Kingaroy; 19.2 km (11.9 mi) NNW of Nanango; 158 km (98 mi) N of Toowoomba; 215 km (134 mi) NW of Brisbane
- Established: 1877

Government
  - State electorate: Nanango
  - Federal division: Maranoa

Area
  - Total: 141.1 km^{2} (54.5 sq mi)

Population
  - Total: 1,094 (2021 census)
  - Density: 7.753/km^{2} (20.081/sq mi)
- Time zone: UTC+10:00 (AEST)
- Postcode: 4610
Suburbs around Booie
Corndale	Wattle Camp	Sandy Ridges
Kingaroy	Booie	Sandy Ridges
Kingaroy	Coolabunia; Hodgleigh	Barker Creek Flat; Glan Devon

Booie is a rural locality in the South Burnett Region, Queensland, Australia. In the 2021 census, Booie had a population of 1,094 people.

== Geography ==
Hillsdale is a neighbourhood in the south of the locality (26.55°S 151.9333°E).

Redvale is a neighbourhood in the south-west of the locality (26.5396°S 151.8904°E).

== History ==
The name Booie derives from the name of a pastoral run, which is believed to be a Wakawaka language word meaning carpet snake.

Land in Booie was open for selection on 17 April 1877; 54 square miles (140 km^{2}) were available.

Booie Provisional School opened in September 1892. In 1905, a new Booie State School was erected. Booie State School closed circa 1963. It was at 1015 Booie Crawford Road (26.49772°S 151.92865°E). It initially operated as a half time school with the nearby Holbrook (possibly Hollbrook) school.

Three Mile State School opened on 1 June 1911, but was soon renamed Redvale State School. It closed circa 1939. It was on the north-east corner of Kingaroy Barkers Creek Road and Redvale Road (26.53998°S 151.88913°E).

Hillsdale State School opened on 23 November 1916. It had a number of temporary closures over the years. It closed permanently on 31 December 1966. It was at 6 Mcauliffes Road (26.54348°S 151.94167°E).

In June 1954, Booie hit the news after local boys claimed to have seen a two-legged monster in a cave. Despite searching by experienced bushman, the monster was not found and it was speculated that the boys had seen a large kangaroo.

== Demographics ==
In the 2011 census, Booie had a population of 912 people.

In the 2016 census, Booie had a population of 1,040 people.

In the 2021 census, Booie had a population of 1,094 people.

== Education ==
There are no schools in Booie. The nearest government primary schools are:

- Wooroolin State School in Wooroolin to the north-west
- Crawford State School in Crawford to the west
- Kingaroy State School in neighbouring Kingaroy to the west
- Taabinga State School in neighbouring Kingaroy to the south-west
- Coolabunia State School in neighbouring Coolabunia to the south
- Nanango State School in Nanango to the south-east

The nearest government secondary schools are Kingaroy State High School in Kingaroy and Nanango State High School in Nanango.

== Facilities ==
Booie Hall is at 1226 Booie Road (26.5383°S 151.9851°E). It is used for dancing and can be hired.

Booie Cemetery is on Radunza Road (off the Kingaroy-Barkers Creek Road, 26.5192°S 151.9341°E).

== Attractions ==
Despite its name, the Coolabunia bora ring is at Reagon Road in Booie (26.56484°S 151.91907°E).
