= Corndale, Queensland =

Corndale
- Suburb
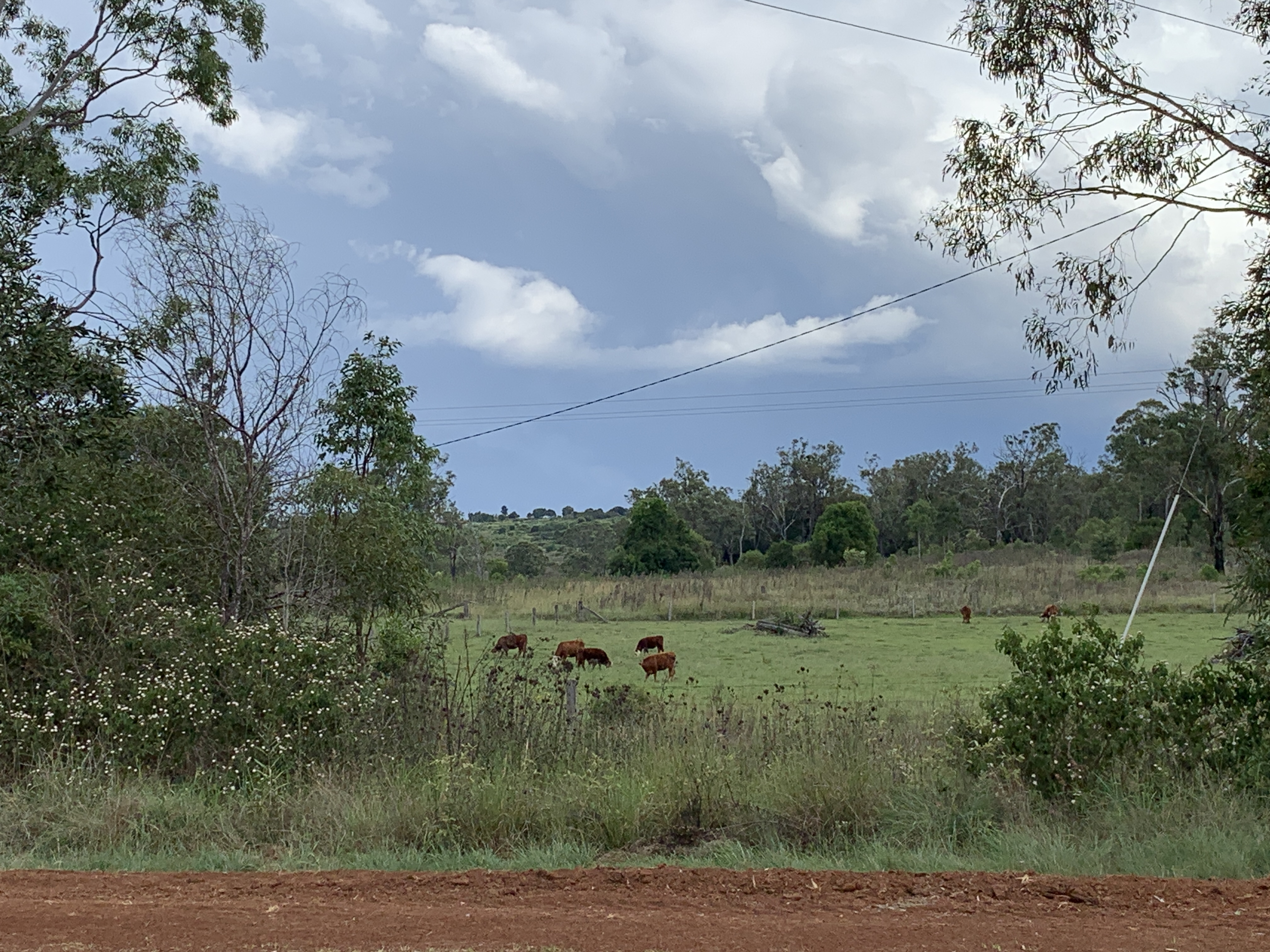
- Cattle grazing, Corndale Road, 2023

- Interactive map of Corndale
- Coordinates: 26.4497°S 151.8825°E
- Country: Australia
- State: Queensland
- LGA: South Burnett Region
- Location: 15.2 km (9.4 mi) N of Kingaroy; 127 km (79 mi) SW of Gympie; 230 km (140 mi) NW of Brisbane

Government
  - State electorate: Nanango
  - Federal division: Maranoa

Area
  - Total: 34.3 km^{2} (13.2 sq mi)

Population
  - Total: 58 (2021 census)
  - Density: 1.691/km^{2} (4.38/sq mi)
- Time zone: UTC+10:00 (AEST)
- Postcode: 4610
Suburbs around Corndale
Wooroolin	Wooroolin	Charlestown
Memerambi	Corndale	Wattle Camp
Kingaroy	Booie	Booie

Corndale is a rural locality in the South Burnett Region, Queensland, Australia. In the 2021 census, Corndale had a population of 58 people.

== Geography ==
Childs Hill is in the centre of the locality (26.4480°S 151.8797°E), rising 505 metres (1,657 ft) above sea level.

The land use is a mixture of crop-growing and grazing on native vegetation.

== History ==
Corndale State School (sometimes written as Corn Dale State School) opened on 23 July 1912 and closed in 1959. It was on Corndale Road (formerly Barkers Creek Road) at 26.43841°S 151.88832°E.

In 1956, the Methodist Church in Memerambi was relocated to Corndale where it opened in 1957. It was originally built in Memerambi in 1908 at a cost of £100. In 1977, it became Corndale Uniting Church.

== Demographics ==
In the 2016 census, Corndale had a population of 42 people.

In the 2021 census, Corndale had a population of 58 people.

== Education ==
There are no schools in Corndale. The nearest government primary schools are Wooroolin State School in neighbouring Wooroolin to the north-west and Crawford State School in Crawford to the south-east. The nearest government secondary schools are Wondai State School (to Year 10) in Wondai to the north and Kingaroy State High School (to Year 12) in neighbouring Kingaroy to the south-west.

== Amenities ==
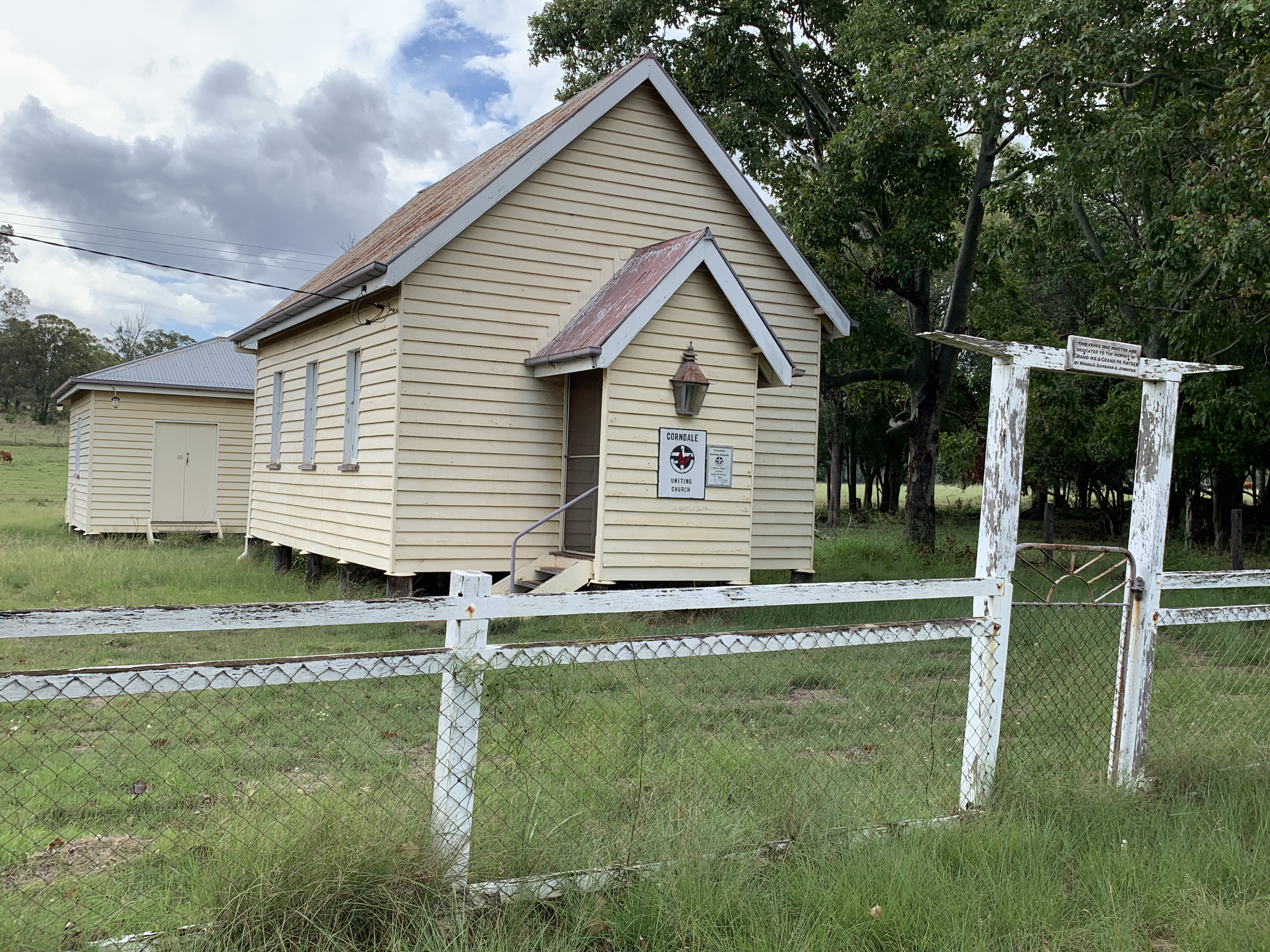
Corndale Uniting Church (formerly Methodist), Corndale Road, 2023

Corndale Uniting Church is on Corndale Road (26.4391°S 151.8913°E).
