= Moondooner, Queensland =

Moondooner
- Suburb
- Interactive map of Moondooner
- Coordinates: 26.2413°S 152.0224°E
- Country: Australia
- State: Queensland
- LGA: South Burnett Region
- Location: 8.3 km (5.2 mi) E of Murgon; 53.7 km (33.4 mi) NE of Kingaroy; 86.9 km (54.0 mi) W of Gympie; 245 km (152 mi) NNW of Brisbane

Government
  - State electorate: Nanango
  - Federal division: Wide Bay

Area
  - Total: 19.1 km^{2} (7.4 sq mi)

Population
  - Total: 45 (2021 census)
  - Density: 2.36/km^{2} (6.10/sq mi)
- Time zone: UTC+10:00 (AEST)
- Postcode: 4605
Suburbs around Moondooner
Manyung	Manyung	Goomeri
Murgon	Moondooner	Goomeri
Murgon	Redgate	Redgate

Moondooner is a rural locality in the South Burnett Region, Queensland, Australia. In the 2021 census, Moondooner had a population of 45 people.

== Geography ==
The land use is grazing on native vegetation with some crop growing.

== Demographics ==
In the 2016 census, Moondooner had a population of 58 people.

In the 2021 census, Moondooner had a population of 45 people.

== Education ==
There are no schools in Moondooner. The nearest government primary schools are Murgon State School in neighbouring Murgon to the west and Moffatdale State School in Moffatdale to the south. The nearest government secondary schools are Murgon State High School (to Year 12) in Murgon and Goomeri State School (to Year 10) in neighbouring Goomeri to the north-west.
