= Barambah, Queensland =

Barambah
- Suburb
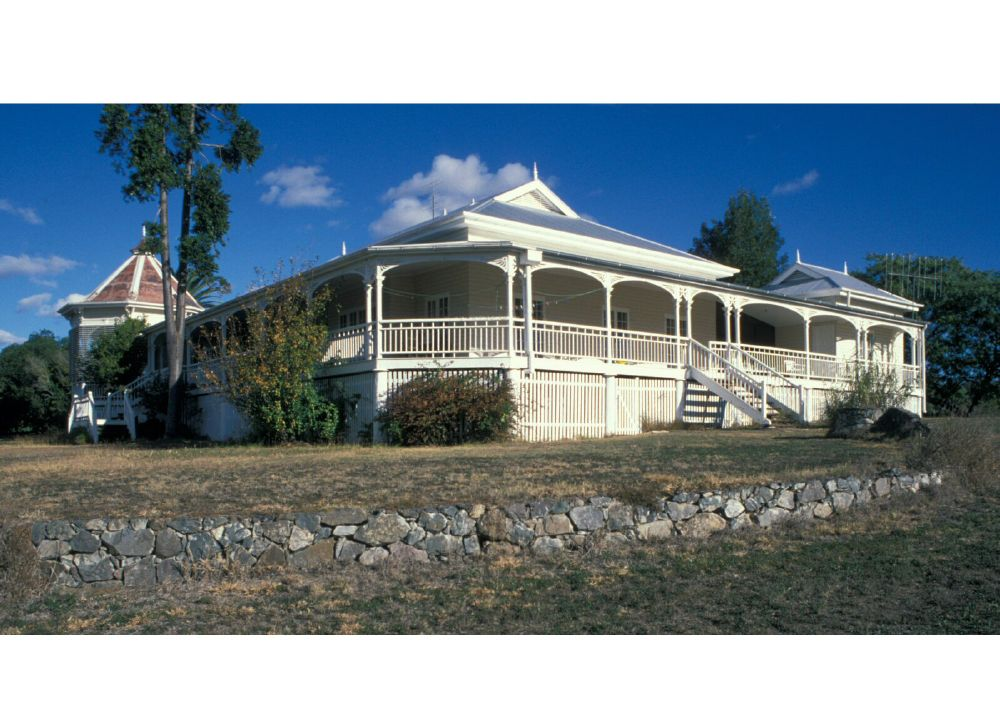
- Barambah Homestead

- Interactive map of Barambah
- Coordinates: 26.3163°S 152.1316°E
- Country: Australia
- State: Queensland
- LGA: Gympie Region
- Location: 22.7 km (14.1 mi) SE of Murgon; 93.5 km (58.1 mi) W of Gympie; 238 km (148 mi) NNW of Brisbane

Government
  - State electorate: Nanango
  - Federal division: Wide Bay

Area
  - Total: 160.0 km^{2} (61.8 sq mi)

Population
  - Total: 39 (2021 census)
  - Density: 0.244/km^{2} (0.631/sq mi)
- Time zone: UTC+10:00 (AEST)
- Postcode: 4601
Suburbs around Barambah
Redgate	Goomeri	Kinbombi
Moffatdale	Barambah	Manumbar
Charlestown	Johnstown	Elgin Vale

Barambah is a rural locality in the Gympie Region, Queensland, Australia. In the 2021 census, Barambah had a population of 39 people.

== Geography ==
The locality of Barambah is bounded to the south-west by Lake Barambah, created by the Bjelke-Petersen Dam.

The Burnett Highway enters the locality from the north-west (Goomeri) and forms most of the western boundary of the locality; it exits to the south (Johnstown). The Kilcoy–Murgon Road enters the locality from the east (Manumbar) and exits to the north-west (Redgate).

The land use is predominantly grazing on native vegetation.

== History ==
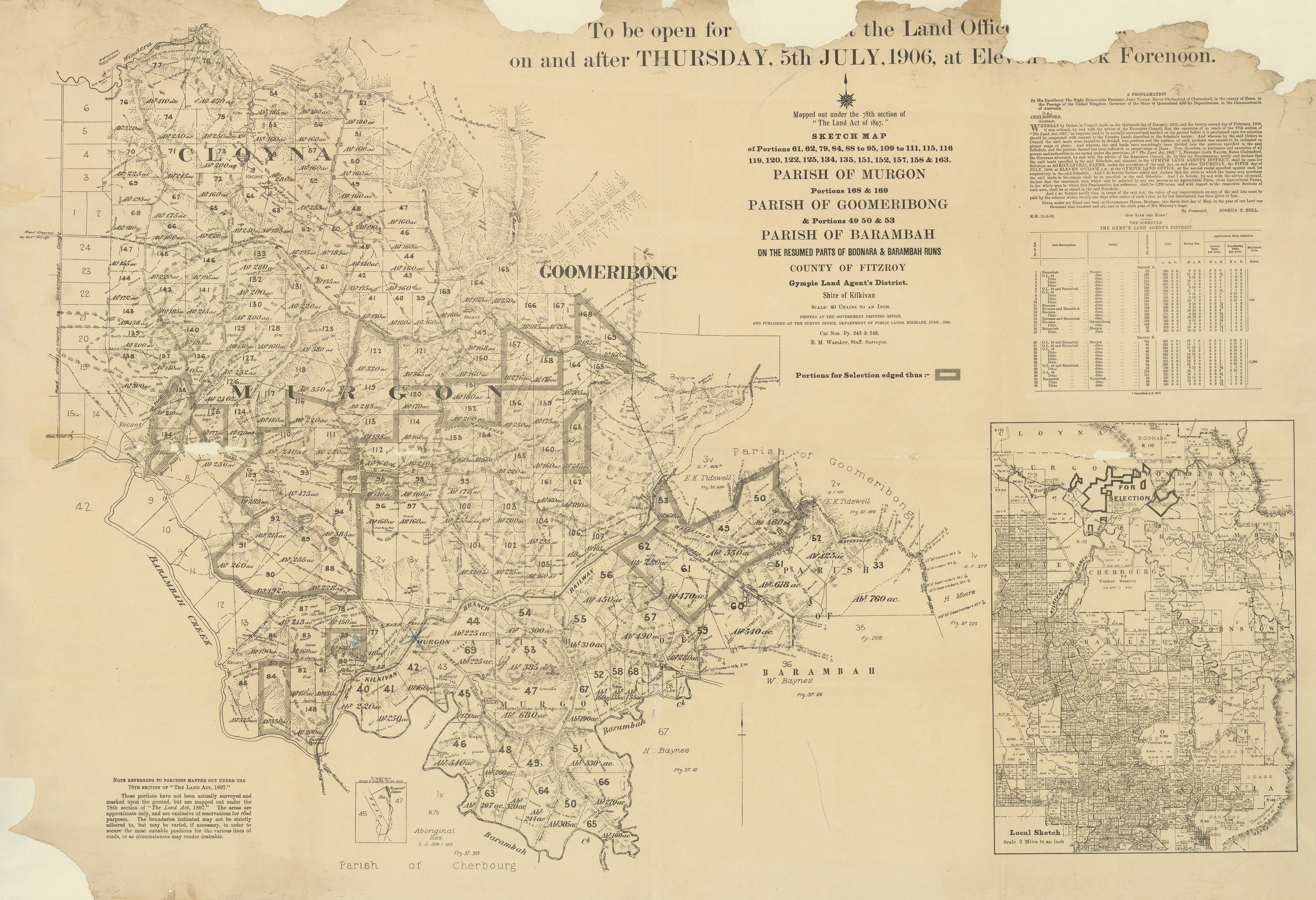
Map of land sales, 1906

Land was open for selection on 17 April 1877; 11,000 acres (4,500 ha) were available in Baramba, 18,500 acres (7,500 ha) in Baramba North, 28 square miles (73 km^{2}) in East Baramba and 4,500 acres (1,800 ha) in the Baramba Ranges.

In July 1906, 32 allotments were advertised for selection by the Department of Public Lands Office. The map advertising the land selection states the allotments are portions in the Parishes of Murgon, Goomeribong and Barambah. The portions were left over from 5 April 1906.

== Demographics ==
In the 2016 census, Barambah had a population of 46 people.

In the 2021 census, Barambah had a population of 39 people.

== Heritage listings ==
Barambah has a number of heritage-listed sites, including:

- Barambah Homestead, Goomeri Road (26.3331°S 152.0747°E)

== Education ==
There are no schools in Barambah. The nearest government primary schools are Moffatdale State School in neighbouring Moffatdale to the west and Goomeri State School in neighbouring Goomeri. The nearest government secondary schools are Goomeri State School (to Year 10) and Murgon State High School (to Year 12) in Murgon to the west.
