= Sandy Ridges =

- Suburb
- Interactive map of Sandy Ridges
- Coordinates: 26.5136°S 152.0316°E
- Country: Australia
- State: Queensland
- LGA: South Burnett Region
- Location: 17.2 km (10.7 mi) N of Nanango; 22.0 km (13.7 mi) E of Kingaroy; 156 km (97 mi) N of Toowoomba; 204 km (127 mi) NW of Brisbane

Government
  - State electorate: Nanango
  - Federal division: Maranoa

Area
  - Total: 68.5 km^{2} (26.4 sq mi)

Population
  - Total: 111 (2021 census)
  - Density: 1.620/km^{2} (4.197/sq mi)
- Time zone: UTC+10:00 (AEST)
- Postcode: 4615
Suburbs around Sandy Ridges
Wattle Camp	Wyalla	Wyalla
Booie	Sandy Ridges	Runnymede
Glan Devon	Runnymede	Runnymede

Sandy Ridges is a rural locality in the South Burnett Region, Queensland, Australia. In the 2021 census, Sandy Ridges had a population of 111 people.

== History ==
Sandy Ridges State School opened in 1910 and closed in 1956. It was at 1634 Burnett Highway (26.52758°S 152.01225°E).

== Demographics ==
In the 2016 census, Sandy Ridges had a population of 89 people.

In the 2021 census, Sandy Ridges had a population of 111 people.

== Education ==
There are no schools in Sandy Ridges. The nearest government primary schools are Nanango State School in Nanango to the south, Coolabunia State School at Coolabunia to the south-west, and Moffatdale State School in Moffatdale to the north. The nearest government secondary schools are Nanango State High School in Nanango to the south and Kingaroy State High School in Kingaroy to the west.
