= Elgin Vale, Queensland =

Elgin Vale
- Suburb
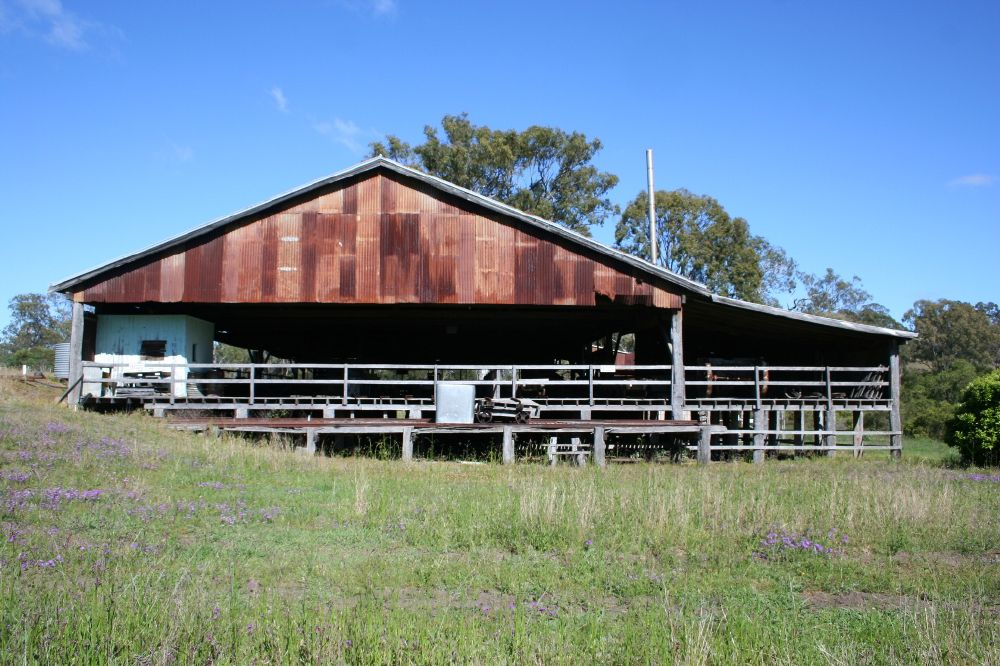
- Elgin Vale Sawmill, 2008

- Interactive map of Elgin Vale
- Coordinates: 26.4316°S 152.2094°E
- Country: Australia
- State: Queensland
- LGA: Gympie Region
- Location: 37.5 km (23.3 mi) NE of Nanango; 41.9 km (26.0 mi) SE of Murgon; 113 km (70 mi) SW of Gympie; 184 km (114 mi) NNW of Brisbane

Government
  - State electorate: Nanango
  - Federal division: Wide Bay

Area
  - Total: 117.7 km^{2} (45.4 sq mi)

Population
  - Total: 0 (2021 census)
  - Density: 0.000/km^{2} (0.000/sq mi)
- Time zone: UTC+10:00 (AEST)
- Postcode: 4615
Suburbs around Elgin Vale
Johnstown	Barambah	Manumbar
Johnstown	Elgin Vale	Manumbar
Johnstown	Mount Stanley	Mount Stanley

Elgin Vale is a rural locality in the Gympie Region, Queensland, Australia. In the 2021 census, Elgin Vale had "no people or a very low population".

== Geography ==
Tinglemara is neighbourhood in the west of the locality (26.4333°S 152.1833°E).

== History ==
In 1847 John Mortimer selected Manumbar, a 64,000-acre (26,000 ha) holding between Nanango and present day Goomeri, which included the site of the Elgin Vale sawmill.

When land was resumed from the Gallangowan run of Manumbar in 1878, 400 acres (160 ha) were set aside for a Camping and Water Reserve (R.81) at the confluence of the Gallangowan and Moonda-Waamba Creeks. It was on Mortimer's recommendation that this area was gazetted, as it was the only permanent source of water in the locality. In 1879, Messrs J & A Porter took up much of the surrounding land, constructing a homestead "Elgin Vale" in close proximity to the reserve.

Elgin Vale Provisional School opened in May 1899 and closed in 1905.

The first sawmill located on Camping and Water Reserve 81, (also known as Scrubby Paddock), was established by Ross and Company in 1908. This operation is thought to have moved to Goomeri in 1914.

During 1926–27, Thomas Herbert (Harry) Spencer established a new sawmill at Elgin Vale, by relocating his sawmill at Sefton (north of Kilkivan) to the reserve. Commercial processing of timber was underway by late 1927.

The establishment of the sawmill brought workers and their families to the area. The second Elgin Vale Provisional School opened on 24 January 1927, becoming Elgin Vale State School in 1948. It was at 2876 Manumbar Road (26.4409°S 152.1950°E) adjacent to the sawmill. The school closed on 10 August 1979. In 1982, the school building was bought by the Elgin Vale branch of the Queensland Country Women's Association.

The sawmill was bought and sold over the years, but, by 1986, there was not sufficient timber in the local area to keep the mill viable. The Elgin Vale sawmill ceased operating as a commercial venture on 16 March 1987.

== Demographics ==
In the 2016 census, Elgin Vale had a population of 24 people.

In the 2021 census, Elgin Vale had "no people or a very low population".

== Heritage listings ==
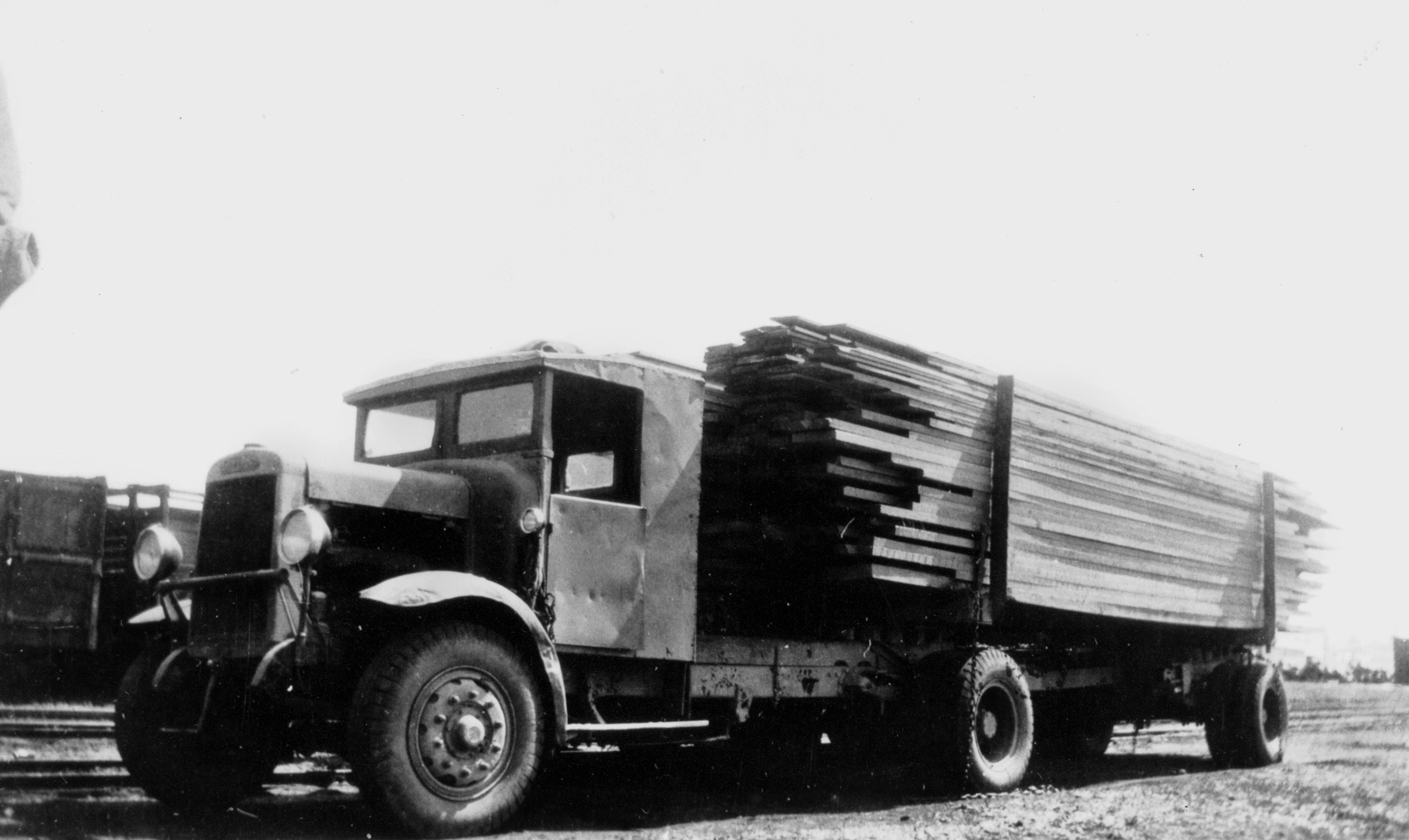
Leyland prime mover hauling a semitrailer loaded with sawn timber, Elgin Vale, circa 1934

Elgin Vale has a number of heritage-listed sites, including:

- Elgin Vale Sawmill, Manumbar Road (26.444°S 152.1923°E)

== Education ==
There are no schools in Elgin Vale. The nearest government primary school is Moffatdale State School in Moffatdale to the north-west. The nearest government secondary schools are Goomeri State School (to Year 10) in Goomeri to the north, Murgon State High School (to Year 12) in Murgon to the north-west, and Nanango State High School (to Year 12) in Nanango to the south-west.

== Community groups ==
The Elgin Vale branch of the Queensland Country Women's Association meets at the QCWA Rooms at the former Elgin Vale State School.
