= Charlestown, Queensland =

Charlestown
- Suburb
- Interactive map of Charlestown
- Coordinates: 26.3666°S 151.9166°E
- Country: Australia
- State: Queensland
- LGA: South Burnett Region
- Location: 21.5 km (13.4 mi) SSW of Murgon; 23.9 km (14.9 mi) N of Kingaroy; 113 km (70 mi) WSW of Gympie; 249 km (155 mi) NW of Brisbane

Government
  - State electorate: Nanango
  - Federal divisions: Flynn; Wide Bay; Maranoa

Area
  - Total: 190.3 km^{2} (73.5 sq mi)

Population
  - Total: 79 (2021 census)
  - Density: 0.4151/km^{2} (1.075/sq mi)
- Time zone: UTC+10:00 (AEST)
- Postcode: 4608
Suburbs around Charlestown
Wondai	Cherbourg	Moffatdale
Tingoora	Charlestown	Barambah; Johnstown
Wooroolin	Corndale	Wyalla; Wattle Camp

Charlestown is a rural locality in the South Burnett Region, Queensland, Australia. In the 2021 census, Charlestown had a population of 79 people.

== Geography ==
Most of Charlestown is within protected areas including Wondai State Forest, McEuen State Forest, Cherbourg National Park, and Cherbourg Conservation Park.

Apart from the protected areas, the predominant land use is grazing on native vegetation with some crop growing.

== History ==
Charlestown Provisional School opened circa 1894 and closed circa 1894.

== Demographics ==
In the 2016 census, Charlestown had a population of 65 people.

In the 2021 census, Charlestown had a population of 79 people.

== Education ==
There are no schools in Charlestown. The nearest government primary schools are Wondai State School in neighbouring Wondai to the north-west, Tingoora State School in neighbouring Tingoora to the west, Wooroolin State School in neighbouring Wooroolin to the south-west, and Moffatdale State School in neighbouring Moffatdale to the north-west. The nearest government secondary schools are Wondai State School (to Year 10) in Wondai, Murgon State High School in Murgon to the north, and Kingaroy State High School in Kingaroy to the south.
