= Bullcamp, Queensland =

Bullcamp
- Suburb
- Interactive map of Bullcamp
- Coordinates: 26.5955°S 152.1011°E
- Country: Australia
- State: Queensland
- LGA: South Burnett Region
- Location: 13.4 km (8.3 mi) NE of Nanango; 37.3 km (23.2 mi) SE of Kingaroy; 152 km (94 mi) N of Toowoomba; 200 km (120 mi) NW of Brisbane

Government
  - State electorate: Nanango
  - Federal division: Maranoa

Area
  - Total: 54.5 km^{2} (21.0 sq mi)

Population
  - Total: 58 (2021 census)
  - Density: 1.064/km^{2} (2.756/sq mi)
- Time zone: UTC+10:00 (AEST)
- Postcode: 4615
Suburbs around Bullcamp
Runnymede	Runnymede	Mount Stanley
Glan Devon	Bullcamp	Mount Stanley
East Nanango	East Nanango	Mount Stanley

Bullcamp is a rural locality in the South Burnett Region, Queensland, Australia. In the 2021 census, Bullcamp had a population of 58 people.

== Geography ==
Brisbane Gully (also known as Linedale Branch) is a watercourse (26.6252°S 152.0446°E).

Fairbrothers Lagoon is a waterhole (26.6036°S 152.115°E)

The land use is predominantly grazing on native vegetation.

== History ==
Bull Camp State School opened circa February 1913 with 17 students under teacher Miss J. Glover. The school closed in 1920. It was on the western side of Bullcamp Runnymede Road (26.61975°S 152.09858°E).

== Demographics ==
In the 2016 census, Bullcamp had a population of 55 people.

In the 2021 census, Bullcamp had a population of 58 people.

== Education ==
There are no schools in Bullcamp. The nearest government primary and secondary schools are Nanango State School and Nanango State High School, both in Nanango to the south-west.
