= East Nanango, Queensland =

East Nanango
- Suburb
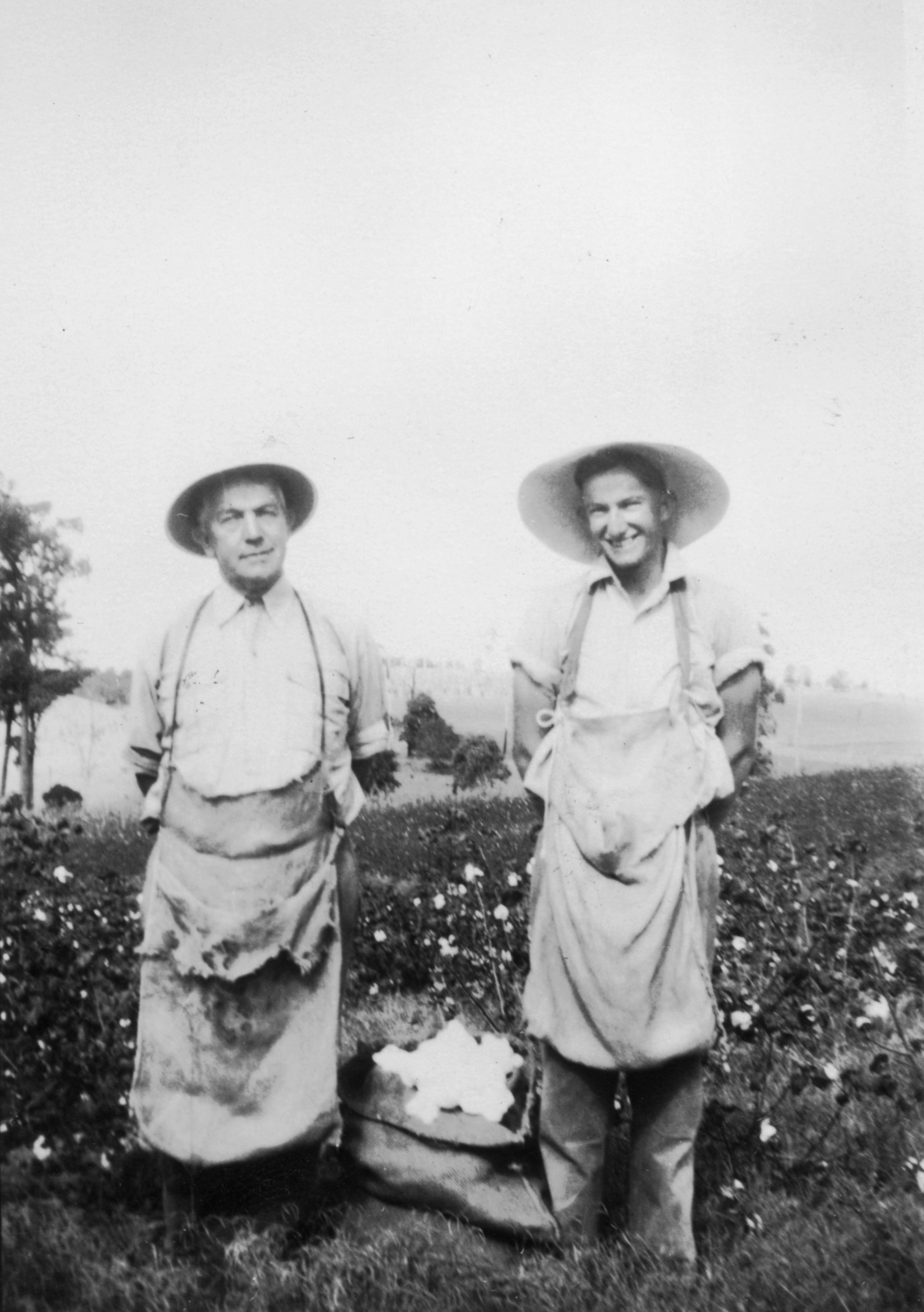
- Picking cotton, East Nanango, circa 1930

- Interactive map of East Nanango
- Coordinates: 26.6775°S 152.0552°E
- Country: Australia
- State: Queensland
- LGA: South Burnett Region
- Location: 3.0 km (1.9 mi) NE of Nanango; 27.4 km (17.0 mi) SE of Kingaroy; 138 km (86 mi) SW of Gympie; 199 km (124 mi) NW of Brisbane

Government
  - State electorate: Nanango
  - Federal division: Maranoa

Area
  - Total: 59.3 km^{2} (22.9 sq mi)

Population
  - Total: 273 (2021 census)
  - Density: 4.604/km^{2} (11.92/sq mi)
- Time zone: UTC+10:00 (AEST)
- Postcode: 4615
Suburbs around East Nanango
Glan Devon	Bullcamp	Mount Stanley
Nanango	East Nanango	Mount Stanley
South East Nanango	Teelah	Avoca Vale; Taromeo

East Nanango is a rural locality in the South Burnett Region, Queensland, Australia. In the 2021 census, East Nanango had a population of 273 people.

== Geography ==
Much of the western part of the locality is within the East Nanango State Forest. The land use in the rest of the locality is grazing on native vegetation with some pockets of rural residential housing.

East Nanango has the following mountains:

- Mount Marble Top (26.6466°S 152.1080°E) 545 metres (1,788 ft)
- Snowys Knob (26.6781°S 152.0392°E) 505 metres (1,657 ft)

== History ==
Mount Stanley Road State School opened on 6 March 1925 and closed circa 1957. It was located on the north side of Mount Stanley Road (approx 26.6503°S 152.0484°E).

Taromeo Soldiers' Settlement State School opened in November 1934. It closed on 19 March 1944. Despite its name, the school was on the northern side of Greenwood Creek Road in present-day East Nanango (approx 26.69400°S 152.03489°E).

== Demographics ==
In the 2016 census, East Nanango had a population of 265 people.

In the 2021 census, East Nanango had a population of 273 people.

== Education ==
There are no schools in East Nanango. The nearest government primary and secondary schools are Nanango State School and Nanango State High School, both in neighbouring Nanango to the west.
