= Elgin Vale Sawmill =

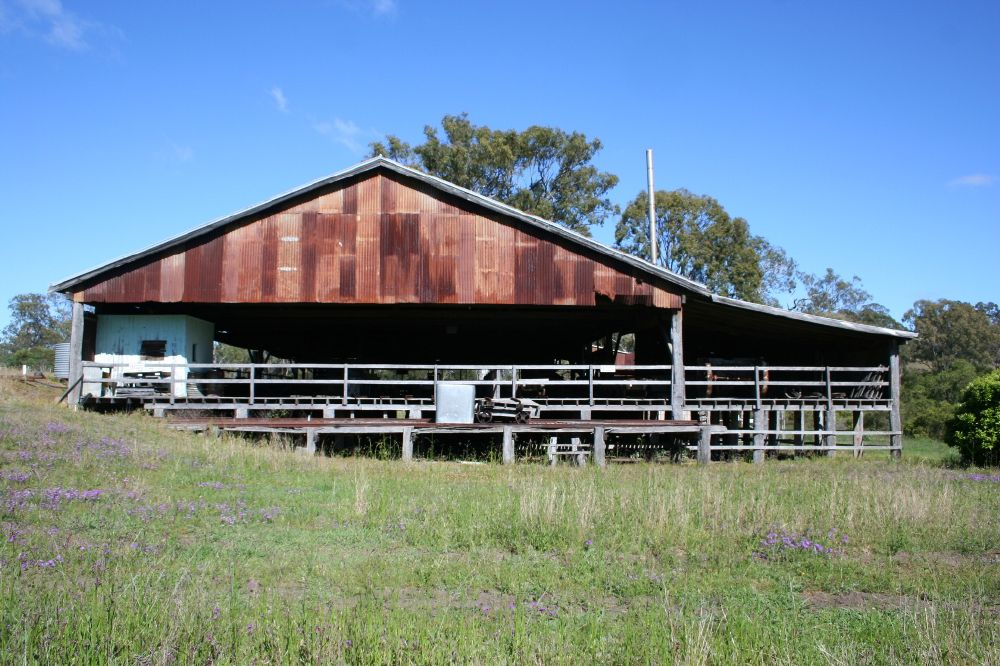
- Elgin Vale Sawmill from SE, 2008

- Location within Queensland Location within Australia
- 26.444°S 152.1923°E
- Location: Manumbar Road, Elgin Vale, Gympie Region, Queensland, Australia

History
- Design period: 1940s – 1960s (post-World War II)
- Built: 1944
- Built for: T H Spencer (mill owner)

Queensland Heritage Register
- Official name: Elgin Vale Sawmill
- Type: state heritage
- Designated: 17 September 2010
- Reference no.: 602762
- Significant components: mill – timber / sawmill, boiler room/boiler house, artefact field, office/administration building, engine/generator shed/room / power supply
- Builders: Wilson Hart Limited

Elgin Vale Sawmill is a heritage-listed sawmill at Manumbar Road, Elgin Vale, Gympie Region, Queensland, Australia. It was built in 1944 for T H Spencer (mill owner) by Wilson Hart Limited. It was added to the Queensland Heritage Register on 17 September 2010.

== History ==
The Elgin Vale sawmill, an open-air timber structure containing a steam operated mill, was built in 1944 by Wilson Hart Limited of Maryborough, replacing an earlier sawmill established in 1927.

Queensland's pastoral frontier and its associated disruption of traditional Aboriginal lifestyles spread throughout the Wide Bay-Burnett district during the 1840s. In 1847 John Mortimer selected Manumbar, a 64,000-acre (26,000 ha) holding between Nanango and present day Goomeri, which included the site of the Elgin Vale sawmill.

When land was resumed from the Gallangowan run of Manumbar in 1878, 400 acres (160 ha) were set aside for a Camping and Water Reserve (R.81) at the confluence of the Gallangowan and Moonda-Waamba Creeks. It was on Mortimer's recommendation that this area was gazetted, as it was the only permanent source of water in the locality. The following year Messrs J & A Porter took up much of the surrounding land, constructing a homestead "Elgin Vale" in close proximity to the reserve.

By the 1870s, timbergetters were working in the South Burnett, servicing the small local markets of Nanango and Kilkivan and hauling logs to Queensland's "timberopolis", Maryborough. The construction of the branch railway to Kilkivan from Theebine in 1886 enabled logs and sawn timber to be sent to Maryborough and Brisbane more efficiently, creating conditions for a viable and larger scale timber industry in the South Burnett. Timber revenue provided the chief justification for the extension of the Kilkivan branch line and after extending through to Goomeri (1902), Murgon (1904) and Kingaroy (1904), the timber industry was a major contributor to the initial growth of these settlements. In townships and in close proximity to forested areas, numerous steam operated sawmills were established to process timber.

The first sawmill located on Camping and Water Reserve 81, (also known as Scrubby Paddock), was established by Ross and Company in 1908. This operation is thought to have moved to Goomeri in 1914.

While the softwood vine forests of the South Burnett contained a variety of millable trees, it was the abundance of hoop pine (Araucaria cunninghamii), in towering stands on the ridges and ranges, that provided much of the district's timber. Easily worked, with a fine, uniform grain, the pale cream to light yellow-brown wood of the hoop pine was widely used in the construction of timber buildings throughout Queensland, as well as for decorative and other purposes. The hilly terrain immediately south of Camping and Water Reserve 81 was dense with hoop pine and in 1914 an area of 7,660 acres (3,100 ha) was gazetted as State Forest R.154. Just outside Kilkivan, about 77 kilometres (48 mi) north of the Elgin Vale site, Mudlo National Park currently protects one of the area's few remaining stands of native hoop pine vine forest, which illustrates its attraction for the timber industry.

In 1926, TH (Harry) Spencer began negotiations to establish a new mill at Elgin Vale, with the intent of shifting his sawmill at Sefton (north of Kilkivan) to the reserve. Spencer had previous involvement in timber industry of the Wide Bay-Burnett and came to play a prominent role in civic and business interests in the (former) Kilkivan Shire.

In March 1926, the year Queensland began to formally regulate the amount of timber that could be cut in State Forests and Timber Reserves, Spencer negotiated with the Queensland Provisional Forestry Board to procure 10 million super feet of hoop pine timber from State Forest Reserve 154, adjacent to Reserve 81. In conjunction with this agreement, Spencer received permission from the Lands Department and Kilkivan Shire Council to establish a large sawmill at an estimated cost of £12 000, with a special lease of five years. In September 1926, Spencer's lease was extended to seven years, while the area of land under lease was enlarged to encompass the whole of the reserve.

The need to extend the area of land under lease was determined by the need to provide accommodation for employees. The development of small self-contained "timber towns" in relatively remote locations occurred throughout the Wide-Bay Burnett. Other examples existed at Wengenville, Manumbar and Eel Creek. At Elgin Vale, two houses for the manager and tally clerk, a number of smaller family cottages, a boarding house, and barracks for single men were constructed. A small school was also built on the reserve, which remained in operation until 1977 (later adapted to a QCWA meeting room and regazetted to form a separate reserve). When a new barracks were later built (c. 1930s), the earlier building was converted into a community hall, which became an important social space for the settlement. In 1961 two houses, seven cottages, a set of barrack's and community hall (in addition to the sawmill and detached office) were recorded on-site.

During 1926–27, Spencer moved all of the machinery and building materials from the mill from Sefton to Elgin Vale, with commercial processing of timber underway by late 1927. After expending considerable effort to establish the milling operations and provision for workers, Spencer owned the mill for a very short period. At the end of 1927, Wilson Hart Company Limited, a long established timber company of Maryborough (1866), had taken over operations. After relinquishing ownership, Spencer operated the mill on behalf of Wilson Hart, maintaining the logging contract to provide timber and to haul milled timber to Goomeri railway station into the 1940s. During his operations at Elgin Vale, Spencer was responsible for introducing modern forms of transport in the district to obtain and transport timber, in the form of Linn caterpillar tractors (the first in Queensland) and motorised trucks.

During operations between 1927 and 1930, the mill's output included 150 000 butter boxes for the Maryborough Co-operative Dairy Association, linking what were then two of the region's most important industries. The effect of the Depression caused periods of closure at the mill during the 1930s, a common occurrence at this time at sawmills across the state. The 1934 burning of Wilson Hart's sawmill at Maryborough saw the relocation of a large number of staff to Elgin Vale. This was a particularly active period at the mill, with three shifts worked over a 24-hour day and the timber town's small population temporarily swelling to accommodate the extra workers.

During World War II, the heavy demand for timbers, for defence and other "essential uses" made Queensland's timber industry a protected trade. In this period, the Elgin Vale mill was sending sawn timber to Wilson Hart's Maryborough mill for the production of ammunition boxes. A fire in May 1944 completely destroyed the 1927 Elgin Vale sawmill, with only the sawn timber in the yard saved. By October of that year, Wilson Hart had constructed a new mill, probably in the same position as the previous structure.

The position and internal layout of the Elgin Vale mill followed the basic design principles for steam powered softwood sawmills of the era, to maximise efficient movement of logs through the mill. The sloping foreground on the southern side of the mill, inset with a series of large logs ramp-assisted the movement of large logs onto the rolling (Canadian) bench, where they were split by the breaking down saw. From here the flitches (long lengths of timber), were transported across wooden skids to the "number one bench", to be cut into boards. If required, boards and off-cuts were then resized at the "number two bench". Both the "one" and "two" saws had docking benches for further cutting of required lengths. Waste timber, used for the boiler's furnace and for fruit cases was sent down a chute close to the number two bench.

Narrower logs were also processed through the frame saw. Vertical saws contained within the frame cut a number of boards simultaneously, with the feed grips of the frame adjusting automatically to the taper of the log. A planing machine for further processing was originally located in the north-eastern corner of the mill, but was later removed. Once cut to the desired specification, the sawn timber was transported on trolleys aligned to rail lines into the holding yard at the eastern end of the mill to season.

The mill was positioned close to the banks of Moonda-Waamba Creek to procure water for the boiler. Situated below the main floor, in the north-west corner were the boiler, engine and drive equipment. The engine, manufactured by T Robinson and Son of England, is thought to have been originally used at a sawmill in Drayton in the early 1900s before being moved to Elgin Vale. Water (which required chemical treatment because of 'hardness') was pumped up to a water tank from Moonda-Waamba Creek and heated by the boiler's furnace, fed on the mill's by-products of sawdust and off-cuts. The steam generated from the boiler powered the engine. A drive belt set over the engine's flywheel was attached to the main drive shaft, and pulleys attached to the shaft drove the various saws on the main floor. Also below the main floor was a workspace for maintenance and sharpening saws, situated near the main engine. Another area was set aside to cut waste timber into fruit cases, which would then be parcelled up and sent away for assembly, with two men generally working at this task.

By the end of the 1940s, the State Forests and Timber Reserves of the South Burnett provided just over 20 percent of Queensland's pine. There were around forty sawmills in the district and during 1947–48, nearly 50,000 long tons (51,000 t) of timber was loaded at South Burnett railway stations. At this time, the Elgin Vale sawmill was thought to be one of the state's largest.

Although electricity became available at Elgin Vale in 1965, the steam driven operations of the mill were maintained, with electricity only used for lighting. Between 1968 and 1979, the mill's daily operations varied from 5000 to 23 000 superfeet a day, dependent on various factors such as availability of timber, weather and machinery problems. In 1971, Elgin Vale's licence allowed for the production of 642 000 superfeet of timber a year.

While Elgin Vale may not have been the most modern mill in its latter decades, it continued to be a viable operation into the 1970s. The quality of the hoop pine sawn at Elgin Vale ensured a constant demand and a ready market for its product. Because of the relative remoteness of Elgin Vale from its parent company in Maryborough, the mill was largely self-contained, with the staff largely responsible for maintaining and conducting necessary repairs to the steam operations and other components of the mill.

In 1978 Wilson Hart was brought out by the Carrick's Group. Following the acquisition, Carrick's disposed of a significant portion of Wilson Hart's assets and the Elgin Vale mill was placed in the Wood Product's division, separate from other former Wilson Hart operations.

By 1986, the Elgin Vale sawmill had exhausted its allocation of timber in the district. Elgin Vale's use of superseded steam-driven technology, in an era when sawmills throughout the Wide Bay-Burnett region were becoming increasingly larger and modernised, coupled with a downturn in the building industry, increased its vulnerability to demise. During its final year, the mill resorted to purchasing timber from elsewhere to supplement its operations. At this time, an average of 20 cubic metres was processed daily, with 11 men employed on-site. The Elgin Vale sawmill ceased operating as a commercial venture on 16 March 1987, with manager Bob Mercer running the last log through the mill.

Following the closure of the sawmill, the Kilkivan and Nanango Shire Councils purchased the mill and remaining buildings, with the intent of maintaining the site as a museum. The original boiler was replaced with one formerly located at Kingaroy Hospital. A large store room, 2 six-roomed dwellings, 3 five-roomed dwellings and other miscellaneous items were all sold for removal from the site. The manager's and tally clerk's houses were retained, renovated and a caretaker was established on-site.

In 1993, Nanango Shire Council ended their involvement with the Elgin Vale sawmill. Kilkivan Shire Council retained responsibility for the mill, publishing a book on its history in 1997. Following council amalgamations in 2008, ownership of the mill was transferred to Gympie Regional Council. As recently as 2006 the steam driven operations of the Elgin Vale sawmill were operated for visitors, offering an insight into a now rare, but once common practice throughout the Wide Bay Burnett/Queensland region.

== Description ==
The Elgin Vale sawmill complex stands at the end of a short access road east of the intersection of the Manumbar-Nanango Road and the Goomeri-Elgin Vale Road, Elgin Vale, approximately 80 kilometres (50 mi) southwest of Gympie. The complex comprises a large open mill shed, detached office, remnants of the former mill township, two cottages and a toilet shed.

=== Mill shed ===
The milling operation is accommodated in a large, rectangular open sided timber-framed shed standing on a site sloping down to the northeast. It is sheltered by a gabled roof clad with corrugated iron sheeting with the roof line notable for two small decorative projecting gable roofs to the southwest side. The milling operations are organised around the main floor of the shed which has narrow platforms running along the short sides, a workshop standing to the east corner and the boiler/engine room standing to the north. The northwest platform, workshop and boiler/engine room are sheltered by skillion roofs. A small rectangular enclosed office stands within the shed to the south.

An elevated hardwood timber floor supported on round timber stumps provides a platform for the milling plant with the drive shafts, belts and pulleys accommodated below connecting to the steam driven flywheel. A line of large round logs perpendicular to the mill floor is along the southwest side of the shed forming a log ramp feeding logs to the breakdown saw bench. The milling plant comprises benches, rollers, saws and other milling plant (all retain pulleys and belts), winches, a gantry crane and tramways (timber and steel rails) with trolleys. A winch stands in the yard to the southwest of the log ramp The traverser rails and trolley run along the southeast side on a narrow timber platform lower than the main floor. A set of timber stairs descends to the northwest from the timber floored walkway along the northwest side. Two boilers, a steam engine and a large flywheel stand at ground level to the north corner with a corrugated iron water tank on a tall timber standing further to the north. A tall metal stack projects from the boiler. Two timber framed and clad shutes between the workshop and boiler room discharge to the waste/sawdust and boiler/furnace areas to the northeast.

=== Office ===
The mill office is a small rectangular timber framed and weather board clad building supported on low timber stumps and sheltered by a corrugated iron clad gable roof standing up the slope to the southeast of the mill shed. An open rectangular entrance porch is accommodated to the east corner from which two solid timber doors (northwest and southwest) open into the office. Other openings include a solid timber door to the centre of the southwest side and small windows to the northwest and northeast sides.

=== Township ===
The remains of the township are on land that slopes up gently to the south of the mill shed. Approached along a dirt track south of the mill office, the remnants include timber stumps, concrete slabs, pieces of metal sheeting, small piles of debris, timber and barbed- wire fencing and three electrical poles, most lying to the west side of the track. The area is now grassed and has a scatter of vegetation.

=== Cottages and toilet shed ===
Two timber cottages and a small timber shed accommodating toilets stand to the southwest of the mill shed. The interiors of these cottages are not considered to be of cultural heritage significance.

== Heritage listing ==
Elgin Vale Sawmill was listed on the Queensland Heritage Register on 17 September 2010 having satisfied the following criteria.

The place is important in demonstrating the evolution or pattern of Queensland's history.

The Elgin Vale sawmill is important in demonstrating the development and subsequent decline of steam driven sawmilling operations in the Wide-Bay Burnett region, an important region associated with Queensland's timber industry. Built in 1944 to replace an earlier mill established in 1927, it was thought to have been one of the state's largest sawmills by the late 1940s.

The Elgin Vale sawmill, in its retention of original fabric and layout, is exceptional for its ability to demonstrate the process of using steam technology to mill the natural resource of hoop pine, historically one of Queensland's principal building materials.

The Elgin Vale sawmill is important in demonstrating the pattern of establishing softwood sawmills in close proximity to naturally occurring stands of hoop pine, while the remains of the township, constructed from 1927, demonstrate the associated provision of accommodation for workers and their families in relatively remote timber milling locations in Queensland.

The place demonstrates rare, uncommon or endangered aspects of Queensland's cultural heritage.

The Elgin Vale sawmill is a rare example in Queensland of a steam driven softwood sawmill in operating condition, demonstrated in its substantial level of intactness and high degree of integrity. Steam driven sawmills were once common throughout Queensland with around 40 operating in the Wide Bay-Burnett district alone in the 1940s. There are no known sawmills in Queensland comparable to the Elgin Vale sawmill in terms of retention of original layout, fabric and operating ability.

The place has potential to yield information that will contribute to an understanding of Queensland's history.

The remains of the Elgin Vale township, established in 1927 to accommodate workers and their families associated with the sawmill, have the potential to contribute to our understanding of the organisation and domestic life of timber settlements that existed in twentieth century Queensland.

The place is important in demonstrating the principal characteristics of a particular class of cultural places.

The substantially intact Elgin Vale sawmill is an exceptional example of a steam driven softwood sawmill, and is important in demonstrating the principal characteristics of its type. Located adjacent to a creek for water and in close proximity to well timbered areas, the mill is positioned below sloping ground to assist the movement of logs. Internally, the layout and the sequence designed to maximise the efficient movement and cutting of logs within the sawmill remain: the long open-sided tin and timber shed, log ramp, breakdown saw, number one and two saw, frame saw, docking benches, waste chute, rails and trolleys. Below the main floor are the boiler, engine and attached drive equipment that provide the power for the operations on the main floor.

The place is important because of its aesthetic significance.

The Elgin Vale sawmill site is important because of its aesthetic significance. The place possesses evocative qualities, generated by the strong visual impact of a tough industrial aesthetic of weathered timber and corrugated galvanised iron, juxtaposed with its quiet rural setting. The remains of the township evoke a sense of isolation and decline of a self-contained way of life that has largely vanished in Queensland.
