= Glan Devon, Queensland =

Glan Devon
- Suburb
- Interactive map of Glan Devon
- Coordinates: 26.6191°S 152.0219°E
- Country: Australia
- State: Queensland
- LGA: South Burnett Region
- Location: 3.2 km (2.0 mi) N of Nanango; 27.7 km (17.2 mi) SE of Kingaroy; 132 km (82 mi) SW of Gympie; 203 km (126 mi) NW of Brisbane

Government
  - State electorate: Nanango
  - Federal division: Maranoa

Area
  - Total: 34.6 km^{2} (13.4 sq mi)

Population
  - Total: 219 (2021 census)
  - Density: 6.329/km^{2} (16.39/sq mi)
- Time zone: UTC+10:00 (AEST)
- Postcode: 4615
Suburbs around Glan Devon
Booie	Sandy Ridges	Runnymede
Booie	Glan Devon	Bullcamp
Barker Creek Flat	Nanango	East Nanango

Glan Devon is a rural locality in the South Burnett Region, Queensland, Australia. In the 2021 census, Glan Devon had a population of 219 people.

== Geography ==
The locality is immediately north of the town of Nanango.

Grindstone is a neighbourhood in the east of the locality (26.6166°S 152.0333°E).

The Burnett Highway enters the locality from the north (Sandy Ridges) and exits to the south (Nanango).

The land use is predominantly grazing on native vegetation with some crop growing.

== History ==
Grindstone Provisional School opened in 1907. On 1 January 1909, it became Grindstone State School. It closed in 1957. It was located on the north side of Grindstone School Road (26.6191°S 152.0238°E). The name may have been inspired a local waterhole in the shape of a grindstone.

A sawmill opened near Grindstone in February 1912.

== Demographics ==
In the 2016 census, Glan Devon had a population of 248 people.

In the 2021 census, Glan Devon had a population of 219 people.

== Education ==
There are no schools in Glan Devon. The nearest government primary and secondary schools are Nanango State School and Nanango State High School, both in neighbouring Nanango to the south.
