= Runnymede, Queensland =

Runnymede
- Suburb
- Interactive map of Runnymede
- Coordinates: 26.5538°S 152.0886°E
- Country: Australia
- State: Queensland
- LGA: South Burnett Region
- Location: 17.7 km (11.0 mi) NNE of Nanango; 32.1 km (19.9 mi) E of Kingaroy; 156 km (97 mi) N of Toowoomba; 205 km (127 mi) NW of Brisbane

Government
  - State electorate: Nanango
  - Federal division: Maranoa

Area
  - Total: 71.7 km^{2} (27.7 sq mi)

Population
  - Total: 192 (2021 census)
  - Density: 2.678/km^{2} (6.936/sq mi)
- Time zone: UTC+10:00 (AEST)
- Postcode: 4615
Suburbs around Runnymede
Sandy Ridges	Wyalla	Wyalla
Sandy Ridges	Runnymede	Mount Stanley
Glan Devon	Bullcamp	Bullcamp

Runnymede is a rural locality in the South Burnett Region, Queensland, Australia. In the 2021 census, Runnymede had a population of 192 people.

== History ==
Runnymede State School opened on 21 July 1948 and closed in 1964. It was at 100 Scott Lane (26.53205°S 152.07291°E).

== Demographics ==
In the 2016 census, Runnymede had a population of 166 people.

In the 2021 census, Runnymede had a population of 192 people.

== Education ==
There are no schools in Runnymede. The nearest government primary and secondary schools are Nanango State School and Nanango State High School, both in Nanango to the south-west.
