= Barambah Homestead =

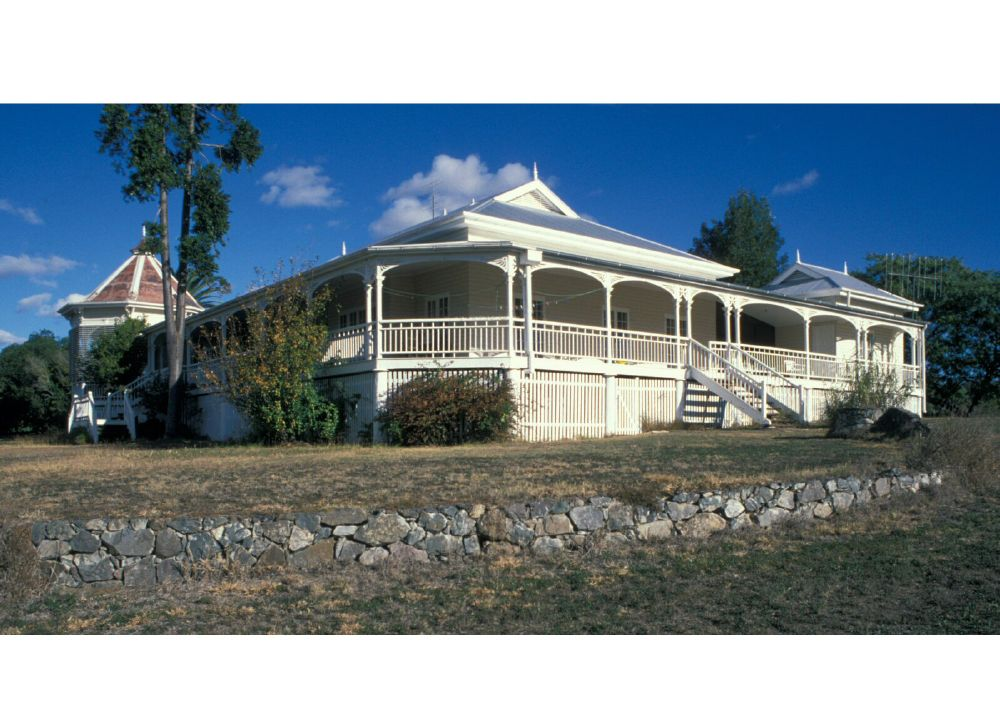
- Barambah Homestead

- Location within Queensland Location within Australia
- 26.3331°S 152.0747°E
- Location: Goomeri Road, Barambah, Gympie Region, Queensland, Australia

History
- Design period: 1840s–1860s (mid-19th century)
- Built: 1906

Site notes
- Architect: Frederic Herbert Faircloth
- Architectural style: Classicism

Queensland Heritage Register
- Official name: Barambah Homestead
- Type: state heritage (built, landscape)
- Designated: 21 August 1992
- Reference no.: 600644
- Significant period: 1840s–1920s (historical)
- Significant components: stables, headstone, garden/grounds, graveyard, views to, shed – hay, coach house, lawn/s, residential accommodation – main house, views from, rotunda

Barambah Homestead is a heritage-listed homestead at Goomeri Road, Barambah, Gympie Region, Queensland, Australia. It was designed by Frederic Herbert Faircloth and completed in 1906 by William (Bill) Clarry formerly of Bundaberg. It was added to the Queensland Heritage Register on 21 August 1992.

== History ==
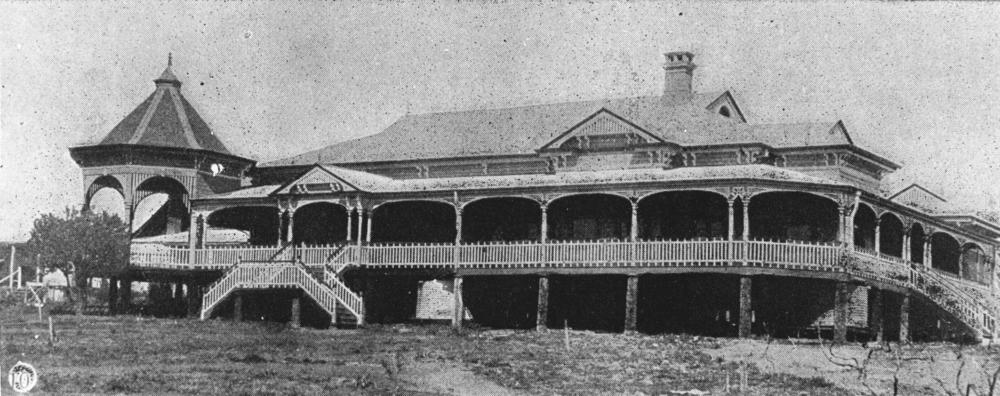
Barambah Station homestead, 1906

Henry Stuart Russell explored the Burnett district in 1842. In 1843, Barambah station was established by Ferriter and Uhr, establishing a homestead and other buildings.

== Heritage listing ==
Barambah Homestead was listed on the Queensland Heritage Register on 21 August 1992 having satisfied the following criteria.

The place is important in demonstrating the evolution or pattern of Queensland's history.

Barambah station was established in 1843 by Ferriter and Uhr in the wake of Henry Stuart Russell's exploration of the Burnett district in 1842. The Barambah site once comprised a complete homestead complex, with some structures reputedly built during the 1870s. Today, the timber residence built in c. 1905–06 stands as testimony to the development of Barambah as one of the earliest principal pastoral holdings in the Burnett district. The physical improvement of the site reflects the growth of the Queensland rural economy during the early 20th century.

The place is important in demonstrating the principal characteristics of a particular class of cultural places.

Despite extensive renovations to the house, the main original divisions between the living areas and private spaces, such as bedrooms, and the internal core and encircling verandahs, remain intact, with the exception of the rear enclosed verandah areas. The place demonstrates the principal characteristics of a substantial Queensland timber residence built in the first decade of the 20th century. The significant associated buildings present in the homestead complex assist in demonstrating how this kind of pastoral property would have operated.

The place is important because of its aesthetic significance.

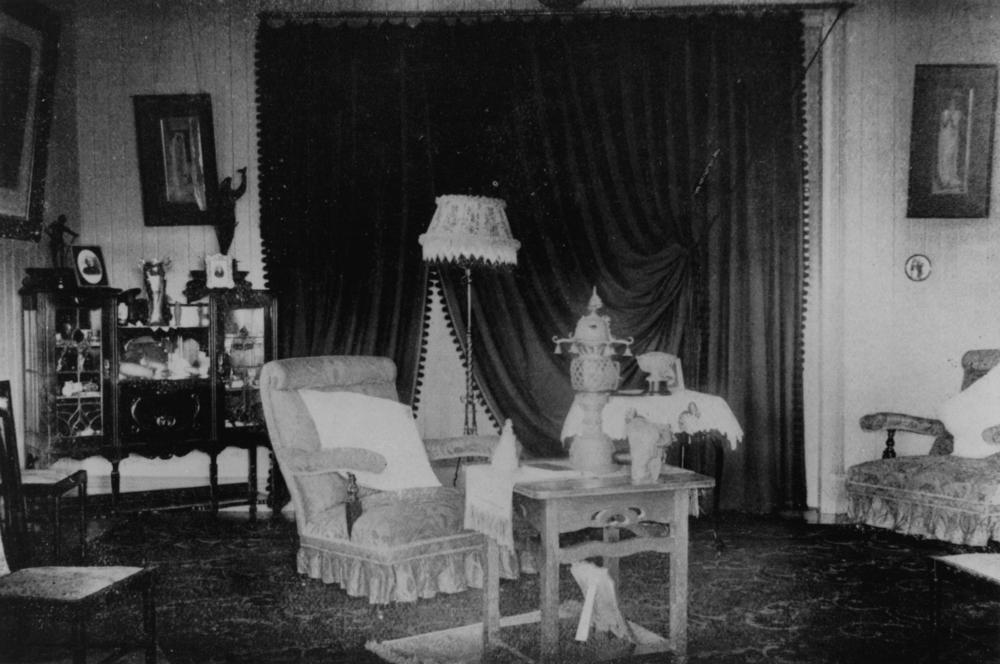
Drawing Room, 1914

The residence exhibits a high standard of workmanship and architectural design, and its elevated position, amidst early garden remnants and overlooking a watercourse, enhances the aesthetic appeal of the site.

The place has a special association with the life or work of a particular person, group or organisation of importance in Queensland's history.

Barambah has a special association with the Moore family, who owned the property for nearly 100 years and who developed it during that time as one of the pre-eminent cattle stations in the Burnett district.
