= Redgate, Queensland =

Redgate
- Suburb
- Interactive map of Redgate
- Coordinates: 26.2722°S 152.0438°E
- Country: Australia
- State: Queensland
- LGA: South Burnett Region
- Location: 10.1 km (6.3 mi) SE of Murgon; 55.5 km (34.5 mi) NE of Kingaroy; 90.9 km (56.5 mi) W of Gympie; 256 km (159 mi) NNW of Brisbane

Government
  - State electorate: Nanango
  - Federal division: Wide Bay

Area
  - Total: 36.4 km^{2} (14.1 sq mi)

Population
  - Total: 94 (2021 census)
  - Density: 2.582/km^{2} (6.69/sq mi)
- Time zone: UTC+10:00 (AEST)
- Postcode: 4605
Suburbs around Redgate
Murgon	Moondooner	Goomeri
Moffatdale	Redgate	Barambah
Moffatdale	Moffatdale	Barambah

Redgate is a rural locality in the South Burnett Region, Queensland, Australia. In the 2021 census, Redgate had a population of 94 people.

== Geography ==
Barambah Creek forms the southern boundary of the locality.

== History ==
Redgate was formerly known as North Barambah.

Redgate Provisional School opened on 15 October 1908. On 1 January 1909, it became Redgate State School. The school was on the eastern side of Finnemores Road (approx 26.25006°S 152.00660°E). In 1934, the school was relocated to 19 Goschnicks Road (26.27097°S 152.01876°E). It closed on 31 December 1973.

A community hall existed in Redgate for many years, although it has since been removed on an unknown date. The hall was mentioned in the Brisbane Courier newspaper on 23 August 1924 when it was reported – "A meeting of the committee of the Redgate Hall was held last week, when the following committee was elected: Messrs. E. Horton. G.Young, A. Sippel, W. Goschnick. W. Notts, and C. Bischioff."

== Demographics ==
In the 2016 census, Redgate had a population of 71 people.

In the 2021 census, Redgate had a population of 94 people.

== Education ==
There are no schools in Redgate. The nearest government primary schools are Moffatdale State School in neighbouring Moffatdale to the south and Murgon State School in neighbouring Murgon to the north-west. The nearest government secondary schools are Murgon State High School (to Year 12) in Murgon and Goomeri State School (to Year 10) in neighbouring Goomeri to the north-east.
