= Brisbane Range =

Mountain range in Queensland, Australia

- Location within Queensland

Highest point
- Elevation: 225 m (738 ft)

Geography
- Country: Australia
- Range coordinates: 26°36′18″S 152°10′38″E

The Brisbane Range is a mountain range near Brisbane, Queensland, Australia.

== See also ==
- List of mountains in Australia
