= Wooroolin, Queensland =

Wooroolin
- Town
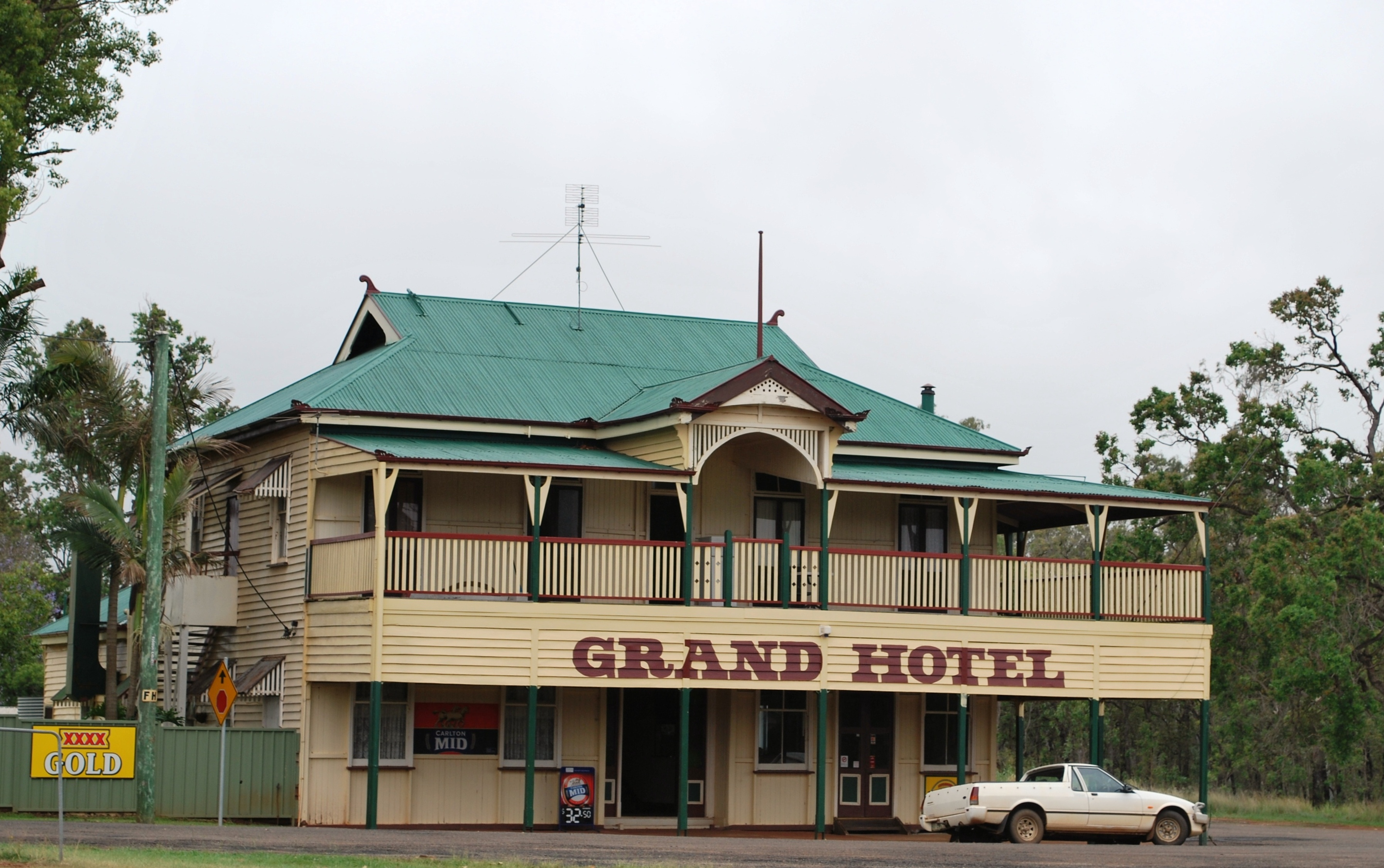
- Grand Hotel, 2008

- Interactive map of Wooroolin
- Coordinates: 26.4097°S 151.8161°E
- Country: Australia
- State: Queensland
- LGA: South Burnett Region
- Location: 13.3 km (8.3 mi) SW of Wondai; 17.4 km (10.8 mi) N of Kingaroy; 120 km (75 mi) WSW of Gympie; 230 km (140 mi) NW of Brisbane

Government
  - State electorate: Nanango
  - Federal division: Maranoa

Area
  - Total: 112.1 km^{2} (43.3 sq mi)

Population
  - Total: 319 (2021 census)
  - Density: 2.846/km^{2} (7.370/sq mi)
- Time zone: UTC+10:00 (AEST)
- Postcode: 4608
Localities around Wooroolin
Wilkesdale	Cusnie; Tingoora	Charlestown
Gordonbrook	Wooroolin	Charlestown
Gordonbrook	Memerambi	Corndale

Wooroolin is a rural town and a locality in the South Burnett Region, Queensland, Australia. In the 2021 census, the locality of Wooroolin had a population of 319 people.

== Geography ==
Wooroolin is on the Bunya Highway, 243 kilometres (151 mi) north west of the state capital, Brisbane, and 17 km north of the main town, Kingaroy.

Immediately to the east of the town is the Wooroolin Wetland, which is classified as a palustrine wetland, a non-tidal, inland, seasonally flooded, vegetated swamp.

== History ==
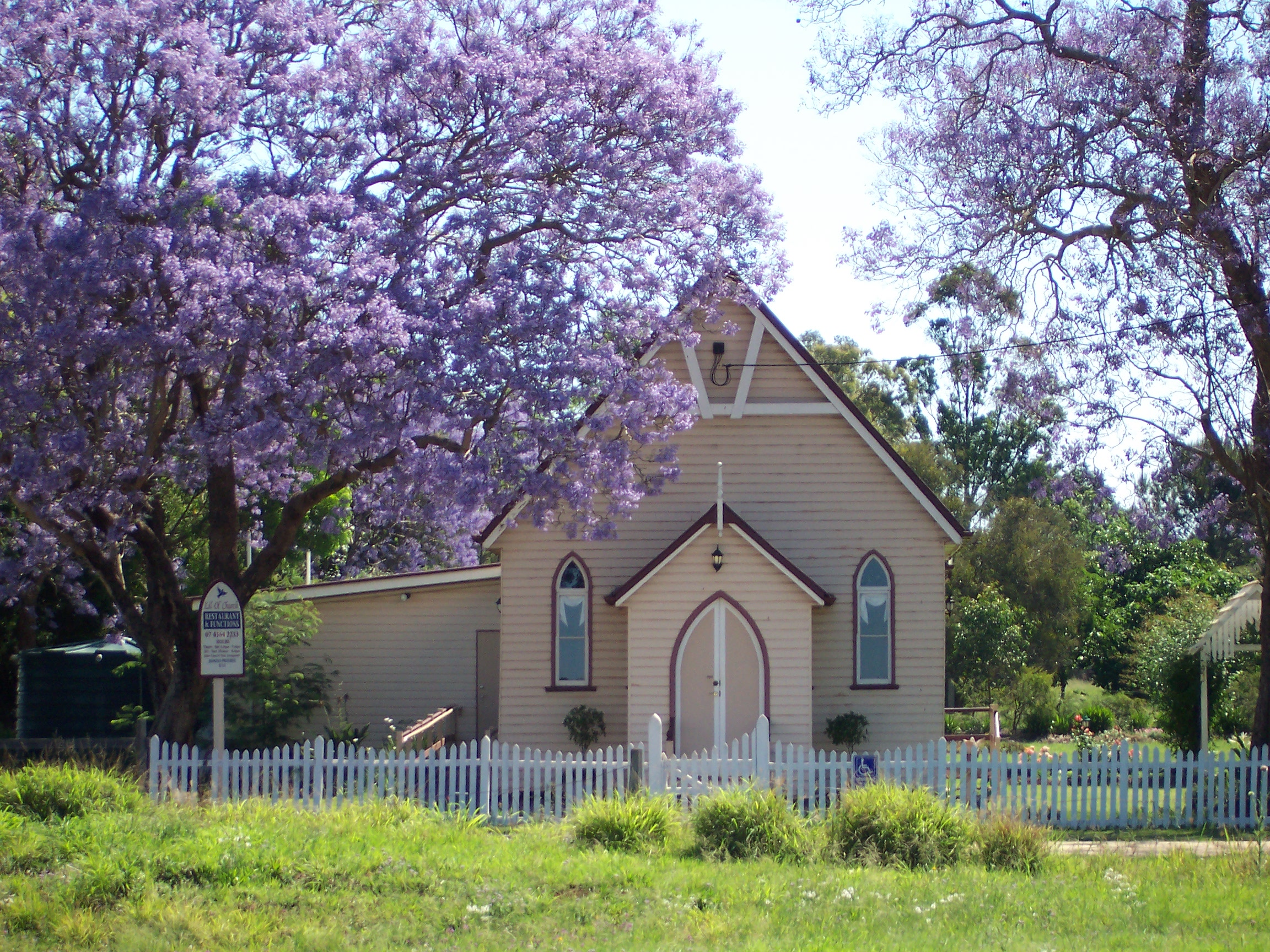
Former Presbyterian church in Wooroolin

Wooroolin Provisional School (also known as Wooroolin Lagoon Provisional School) opened on 18 February 1901 and become Wooroolin State School on 1 January 1909.

The section of the Nanango railway line from Wondai to Kingaroy opened on 19 December 1904, with Wooroolin served by the Wooroolin railway station (26.4118°S 151.8160°E). That section of railway line was closed in 2009. Track removal occurred in 2014 making way for the new Kingaroy-Kilkivan Rail Trail.

Wooroolin Presbyterian Church was opened in 1909 with the first wedding held in the church in December 1909. It subsequently closed and has been used as a restaurant. It is at 1 Alexander Street (26.4137°S 151.8153°E).

In August 1913, the Catholic community in Wooroolin accepted a tender from B. Robinson to construct a church for £206. On Sunday 9 November 1913, St Patrick's Catholic Church was officially opened by Archbishop James Duhig in the presence of 400 to 500 people, 300 of them came by a special train provided for the occasion. It was 47 by 22 feet (14.3 by 6.7 m) and built from timber in the Gothic style at a cost of £330. It was on a 1-acre (0.40 ha) site on a hill overlooking the town at 24-26 Frederick Street (26.40914°S 151.81331°E). It has since been demolished.

St Andrew's Anglican Church was officially opened on Sunday 20 November 1921 by Archdeacon Osborn. It was a timber church capable of seating 50 people. It celebrated its centenary on Sunday 21 November 2021.

Wooroolin West Provisional School opened on 2 April 1929; it closed at some time between 1944 and 1949.

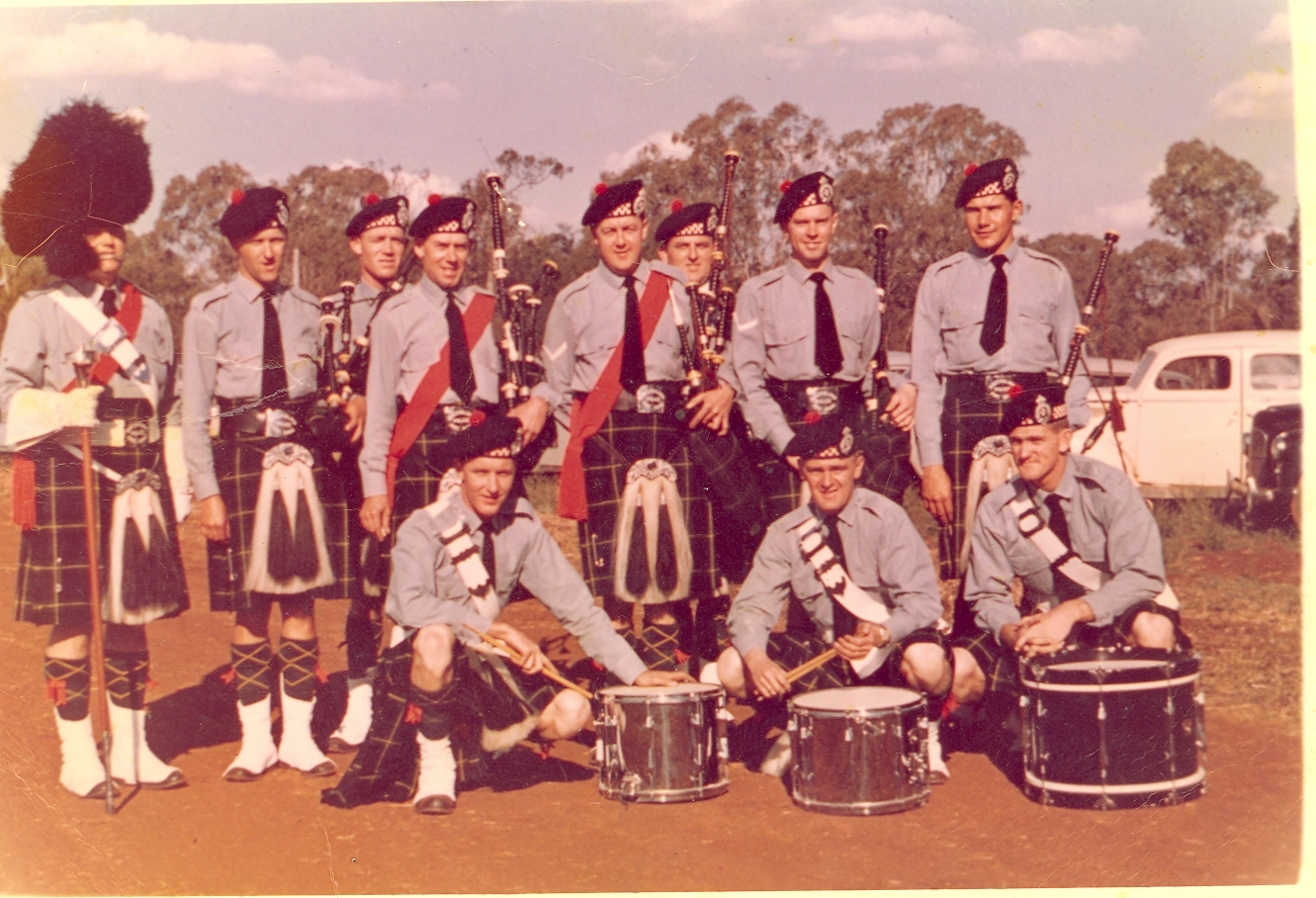
Queensland Police Pipe Band at the 1961 Highland Gathering

From the late 1950s to the 1970s, the Wooroolin – Tingoora R.S.L. organised an annual Highland Gathering at the Wooroolin sportsgrounds, featuring pipe bands and Scottish highland dance.

After successive floods in 2011 and 2013, the wetland burst its banks and Wooroolin was flooded for the first time in recorded history. As at 2015, the wetland was still completely full and resembled a large, shallow lake. Due to a bad drought in later years from 2015 to late 2020, the wetlands drained completely. In November 2021, 305 ml of rain fell across the area in and filled up the wetlands in a matter of weeks for the first time in years.

== Demographics ==
In the 2006 census, the locality of Wooroolin had a population of 164 people.

In the 2016 census, the locality of Wooroolin had a population of 315 people.

In the 2021 census, the locality of Wooroolin had a population of 319 people.

== Education ==
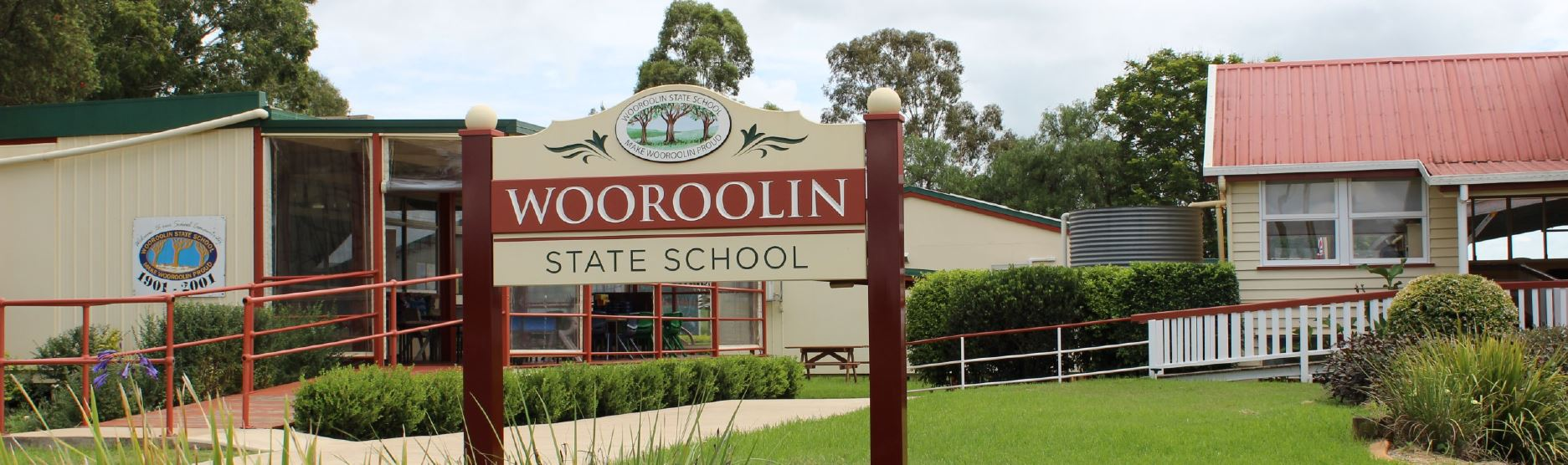
Wooroolin State School, 2019

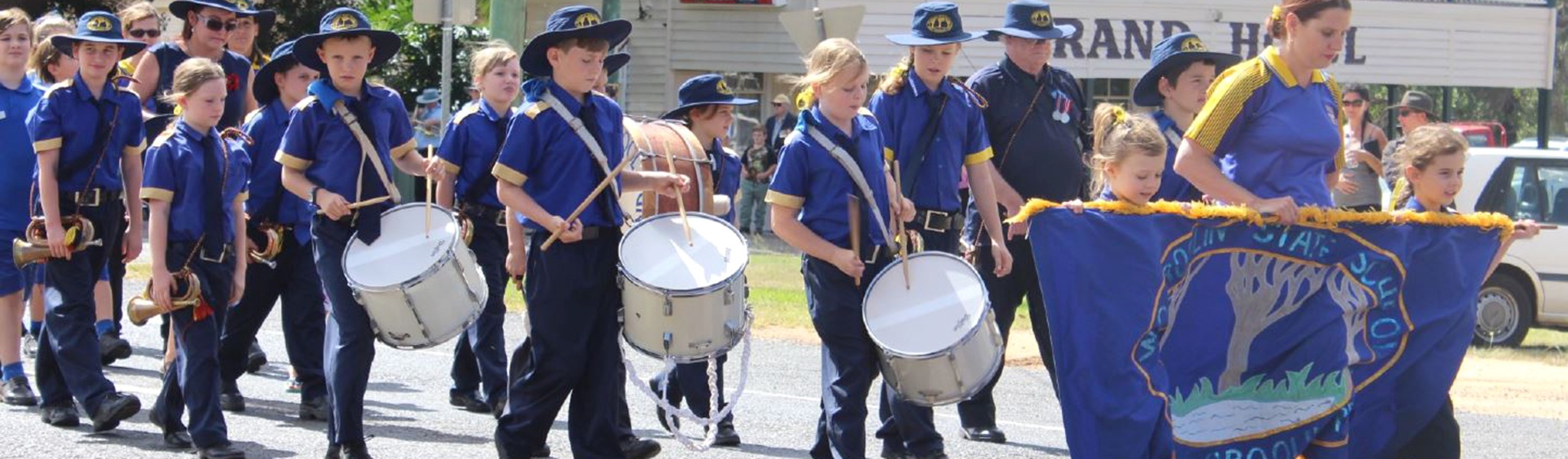
Wooroolin State School bugle band

Wooroolin State School is a government primary (Prep–6) school for boys and girls at 34 Frederick Street (26.4091°S 151.8120°E). In 2017, the school had an enrolment of 44 students with 5 teachers (3 full-time equivalent) and 7 non-teaching staff (4 full-time equivalent). In 2018, the school had an enrolment of 42 students with 4 teachers (3 full-time equivalent) and 7 non-teaching staff (4 full-time equivalent). The school is known for its school band with bugles and drums, established in 1958. The band regularly performs at Anzac Day ceremonies, agricultural shows, festivals and other community events.

There are no secondary schools in Wooroolin. The nearest government secondary schools are Wondai State School (to Year 10) in Wondai to the north-east and Kingaroy State High School (to Year 12) in Kingaroy to the south.

== Amenities ==
St Andrew's Anglican Church is at 19 Short Street (26.411339°S 151.814°E).

The Wooroolin branch of the Queensland Country Women's Association meets at Lot 41 Frederick Street.

== Notable people ==
- Galfry Gatacre CBE DSC DSO (1907–1983), Royal Australian Navy rear admiral and first-class cricketer
