= Crawford, Queensland =

Crawford
- Suburb
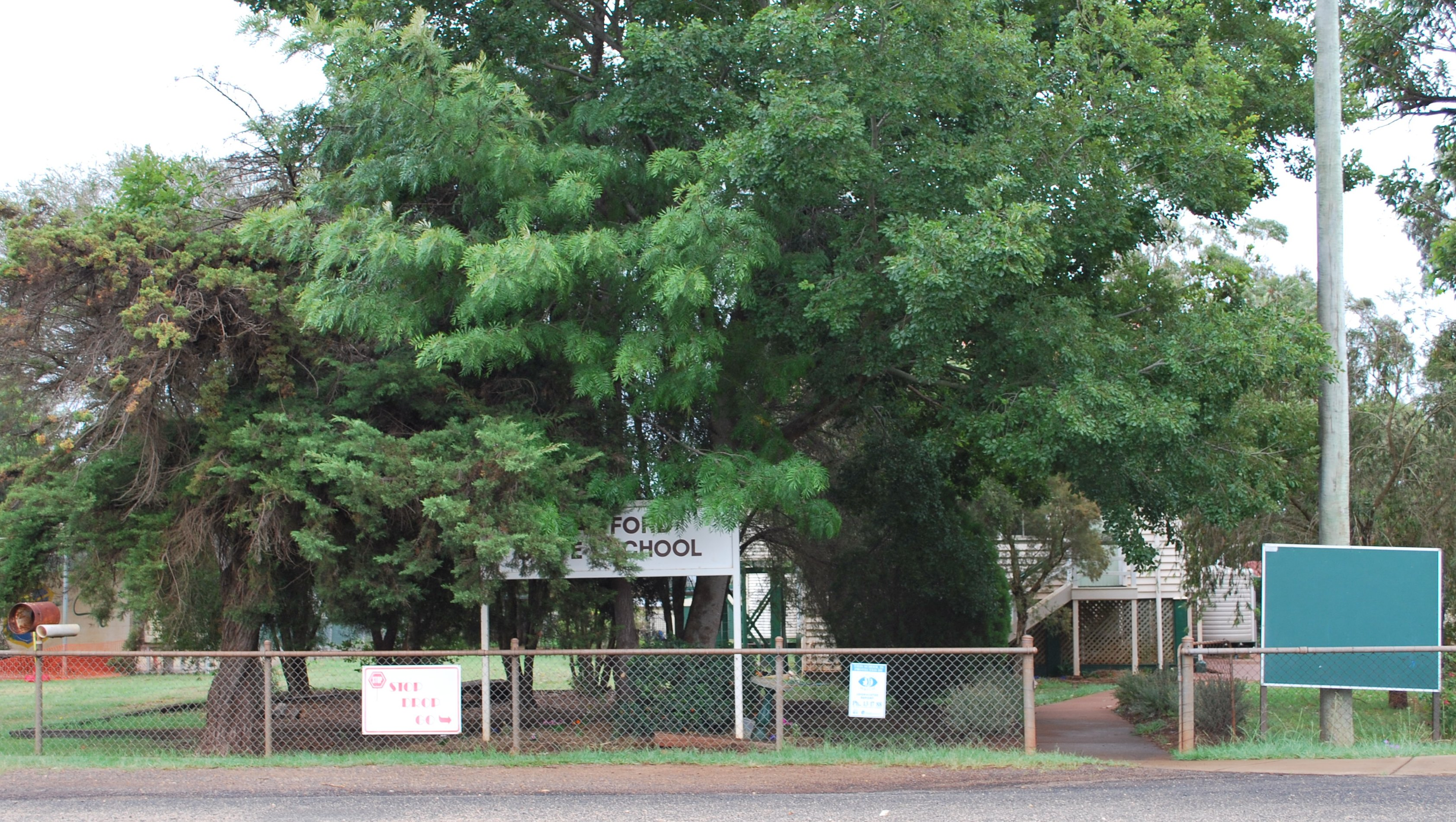
- State school at Crawford, 2008

- Interactive map of Crawford
- Coordinates: 26.4986°S 151.8108°E
- Country: Australia
- State: Queensland
- LGA: South Burnett Region
- Location: 6.6 km (4.1 mi) NNW of Kingaroy; 132 km (82 mi) SW of Gympie; 217 km (135 mi) NW of Brisbane

Government
  - State electorate: Nanango
  - Federal division: Maranoa

Area
  - Total: 22.8 km^{2} (8.8 sq mi)

Population
  - Total: 182 (2021 census)
  - Density: 7.98/km^{2} (20.67/sq mi)
- Time zone: UTC+10:00 (AEST)
- Postcode: 4610
Suburbs around Crawford
Memerambi	Memerambi	Memerambi
Gordonbrook	Crawford	Kingaroy
Kingaroy	Kingaroy	Kingaroy

Crawford is a rural Suburb in the South Burnett Region, Queensland, Australia. In the 2021 census, Crawford had a population of 182 people.

== History ==
The locality takes its name from the Crawford railway station named by Queensland Railways Department in 1904, named after engineer Hugh Ralston Crawford who supervised the construction of the Wondai-Kingaroy railway.

Logboy Provisional School opened on 22 April 1902. On 1 January 1909, it became Logboy State School. It was at 289 Weens Road (now within the present-day locality of Kingaroy). In 1911, it was moved to its current position and renamed Crawford State School, opening with 29 students.

Crawford Methodist Church was built in 1915. It could seat 100 people and was built at a cost of £300. It is no longer extant.

== Demographics ==
In the 2016 census, Crawford had a population of 142 people.

In the 2021 census, Crawford had a population of 182 people.

== Education ==
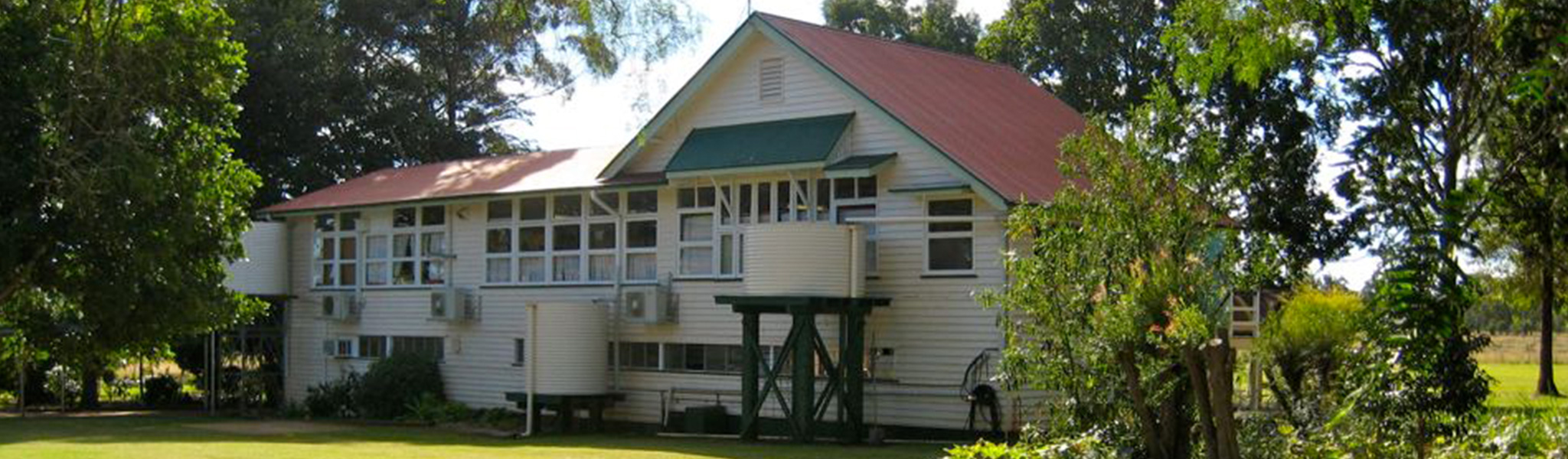
Crawford State School, 2022

Crawford State School is a government primary (Prep–6) school for boys and girls at 215-227 Siefert Street (26.4975°S 151.8225°E). In 2018, the school had an enrolment of 36 students with 3 teachers and 6 non-teaching staff (3 full-time equivalent).

There are no secondary schools in Crawford. The nearest government secondary school is Kingaroy State High School in neighbouring Kingaroy to the south-east.
