= Bjelke-Petersen Dam =

Dam in Queensland, Australia

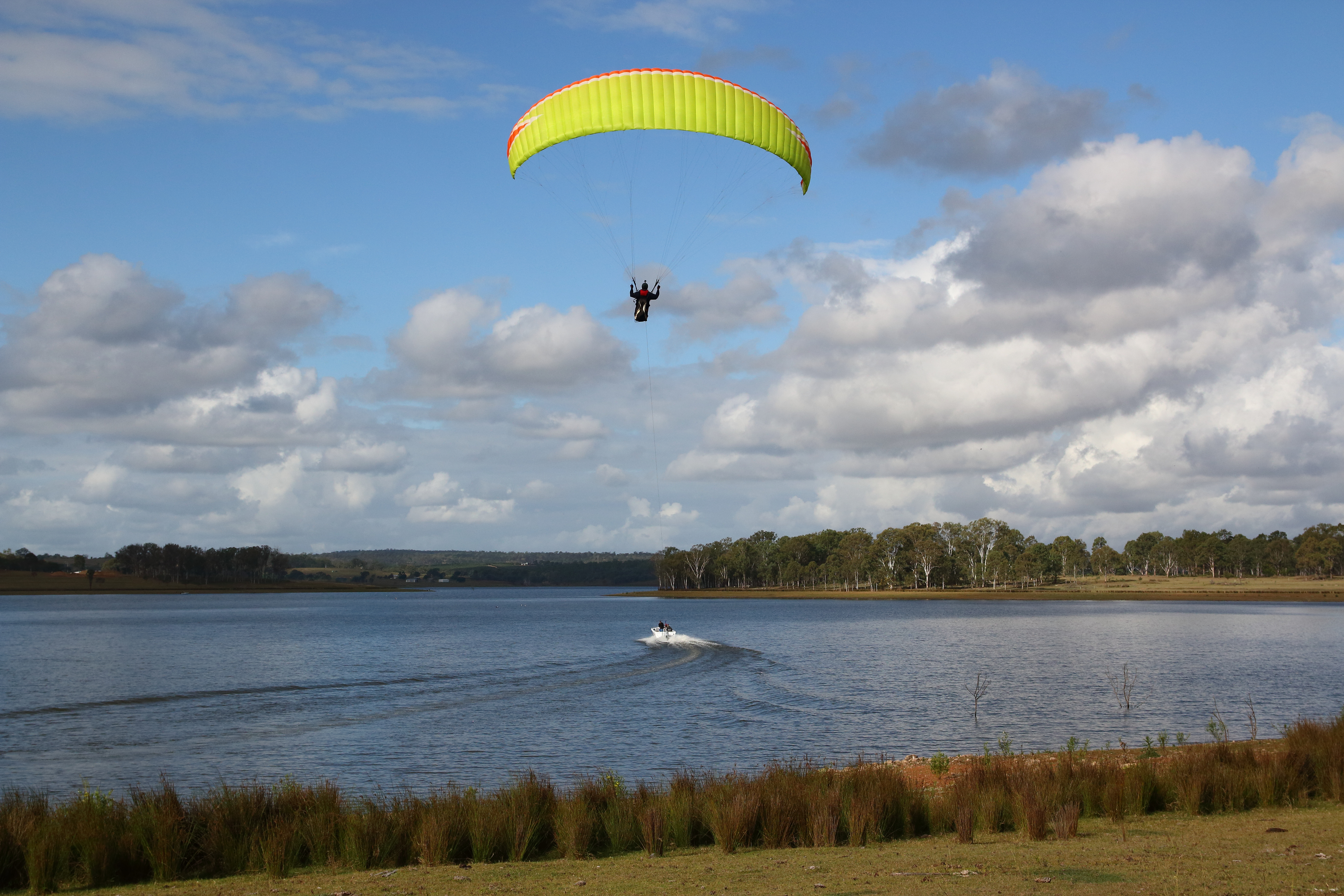
- Parasailing on Lake Barambah, 2014

- Location of the dam in Queensland
- Interactive map of Bjelke-Petersen Dam
- Country: Australia
- Location: Wide Bay-Burnett region, Queensland
- Coordinates: 26°18′13″S 151°58′38″E
- Purpose: Irrigation
- Status: Operational
- Construction began: 1984
- Opening date: 1988
- Operator: SunWater

Dam and spillways
- Type of dam: Embankment dam
- Impounds: Barker Creek
- Height (foundation): 34 m (112 ft)
- Length: 560 m (1,840 ft)
- Dam volume: 641×10^{3} m^{3} (22.6×10^{6} cu ft)
- Spillway type: Uncontrolled
- Spillway capacity: 3,660 m^{3}/s (129,000 cu ft/s)

Reservoir
- Creates: Lake Barambah
- Total capacity: 134,900 ML (109,400 acre⋅ft)
- Catchment area: 1,690 km^{2} (650 sq mi)
- Surface area: 2,250 ha (5,600 acres)
- Maximum length: 620 m (2,030 ft)
- Normal elevation: 303 m (994 ft) AHD
- Website sunwater.com.au

The Bjelke-Petersen Dam is an earth- and rock-filled embankment dam across Barker Creek, located 10 km (6.2 mi) east of Wondai in Moffatdale, near Cherbourg, in the Wide Bay-Burnett region of Queensland, Australia. The resultant reservoir is called Lake Barambah. The dam was named in honour of the Queensland Premier Joh Bjelke-Petersen and is operated by SunWater.

== Geography ==
The earth and rock fill dam wall has a central 641-thousand-cubic-metre (22.6×10^{6} cu ft) clay core that is 34 metres (112 ft) high and 560 metres (1,840 ft) long. The reservoir has a capacity of 134,900 megalitres (109,400 acre⋅ft), that is generally shallow, drawing from a relatively large catchment area of 1,690 square kilometres (650 sq mi). Barker Creek provides the main inflow, while Four Mile Creek, Six Mile Creek, Frickey Creek and Cattle Creek also flow into the dam.

The reservoir feeds the Barker Barambah Scheme, an irrigation scheme that diverts water from the dam for farming in Redgate, Murgon and Mondure. Water flows via a 6.2-kilometre (3.9 mi) gravity pipeline regulated via outlets to the Joe Sippel Weir and the Silverleaf Weir.

== History ==
Construction of the dam commenced in 1984 and finished in 1988. It created the lake that was named Lake Barambah after the original property in the region. The dam was named after the Queensland Premier Joh Bjelke-Petersen. The dam supplies water to the South Burnett region, mostly for irrigation purposes.

In the 1990s management of the camping and recreational facilities was handed to Murgon Shire Council, which became the South Burnett Regional Council following the local government amalgamations in 2008.

The dam first overflowed in February 1999, and reached its highest level of 195.01% (4.52 metres (14.8 ft) over the spillway) in January 2011.

In 2006, drought conditions had reduced dam levels to 5% of total capacity. With such low levels, visitors numbers had dropped significantly and local councils were concerned about maintaining drinking water for local towns.

SunWater, the managing organisation of the dam, undertook a dam spillway capacity upgrade program to ensure the highest level of safety for their dams is maintained. The spillway upgrade commenced in 2007 and was completed in 2008.

== Recreation activities ==
Facilities for caravans, cabins, camping and day-trippers are extensive. Under normal conditions there are no boating restrictions, except near the dam wall.

There are two boat ramps into Lake Barambah, both located on Haager Drive and are managed by the South Burnett Regional Council, known as:

- Bjelke-Petersen Dam (West) (26.3059°S 151.9820°E)
- Bjelke-Petersen Dam (East) (26.3063°S 151.9928°E)

=== Fishing ===
The dam is stocked with bass, golden perch, silver perch and southern saratoga. Additionally eel-tailed catfish, spangled perch and bony bream are present naturally. A Stocked Impoundment Permit is required to fish in the dam. The Bjelke-Petersen Dam Fishing Classic is held every October.

Illegally introduced sleepy cod and red-claw crayfish are maintaining breeding populations. In 2002, Tilapia were posing a threat to the dam, resulting in the need for pipeline screening to be implemented in an effort to stop eggs and larvae entering the dam.

== See also ==
- List of dams and reservoirs in Australia
