= Moffatdale, Queensland =

Moffatdale
- Suburb
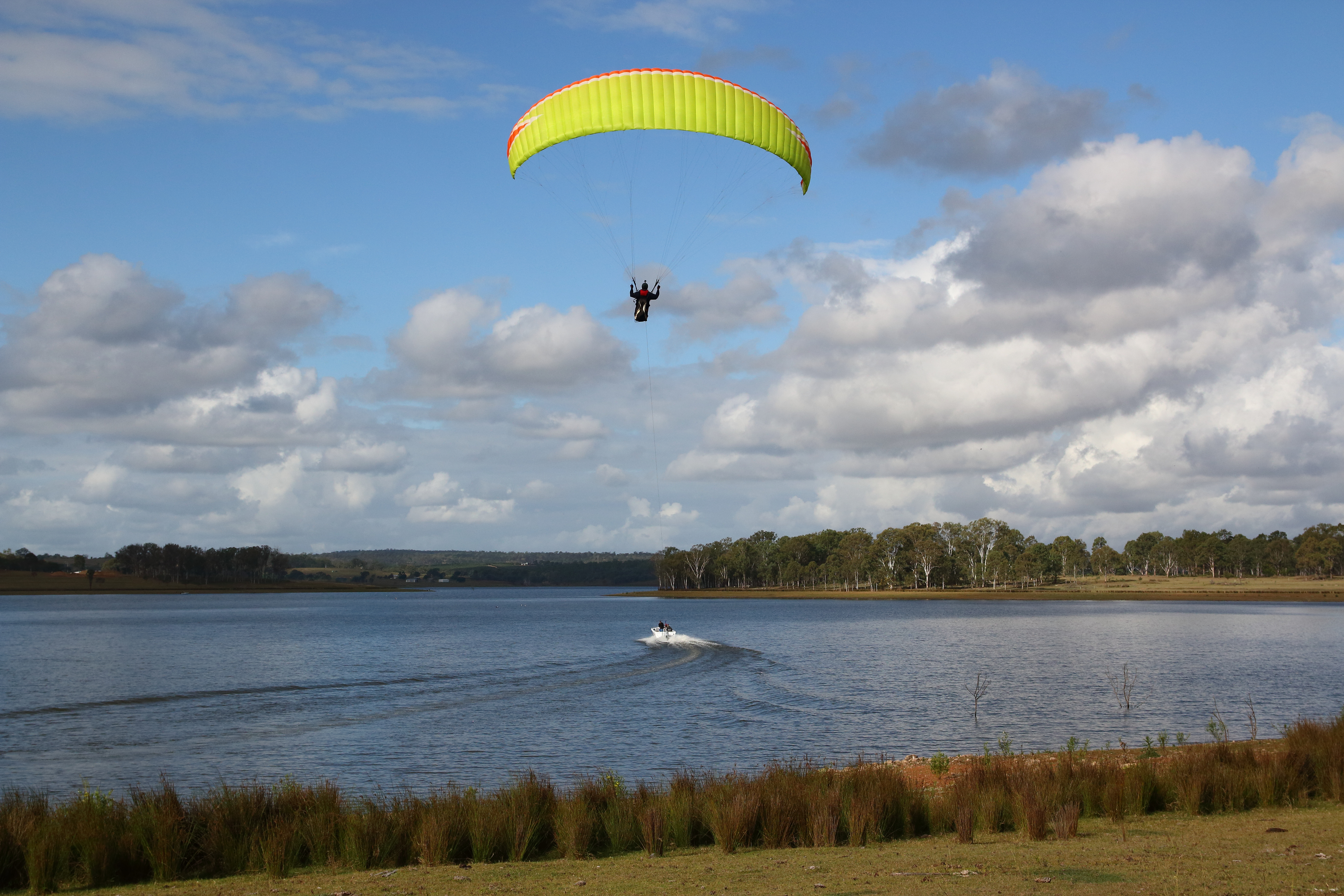
- Parasailing on Lake Barambah impounded by the Bjelke-Petersen Dam, 2014

- Interactive map of Moffatdale
- Coordinates: 26.3080°S 152.0183°E
- Country: Australia
- State: Queensland
- LGA: South Burnett Region
- Location: 11.0 km (6.8 mi) SE of Murgon; 54.7 km (34.0 mi) NNE of Kingaroy; 98.4 km (61.1 mi) W of Gympie; 237 km (147 mi) NNW of Brisbane

Government
  - State electorate: Nanango
  - Federal divisions: Wide Bay; Flynn

Area
  - Total: 52.6 km^{2} (20.3 sq mi)

Population
  - Total: 257 (2021 census)
  - Density: 4.886/km^{2} (12.65/sq mi)
- Time zone: UTC+10:00 (AEST)
- Postcode: 4605
Suburbs around Moffatdale
Murgon	Redgate	Redgate
Cherbourg	Moffatdale	Redgate
Charlestown	Charlestown	Barambah

Moffatdale is a rural locality in the South Burnett Region, Queensland, Australia. In the 2021 census, Moffatdale had a population of 257 people.

== Geography ==
The Bjelke-Petersen Dam is in the west of the locality (26.3032°S 151.9789°E) with the reservoir Lake Barambah (26.3269°S 151.9974°E) extending through the south-west of the locality.

Although Moffatdale is not officially a town, there is a residential subdivision near the school. Apart from this, the land use is a mixture of grazing on native vegetation and crop growing.

There are a number of homesteads in the locality, including:

- Barambah-Dale (26.2954°S 152.0291°E)
- Bridgeman Downs (26.3128°S 152.0059°E)
- Brigalow Park (26.2839°S 152.0043°E)
- Dal Dowie Retreat (26.3283°S 152.0231°E)
- Lakeview (26.3350°S 152.0291°E)
- Moffatdale (26.2939°S 152.0258°E)
- Parrishs Paddock (26.3064°S 152.0151°E)
- Peppercorn (26.3254°S 152.0110°E)
- Sunny Brae (26.3175°S 152.0336°E)

== History ==
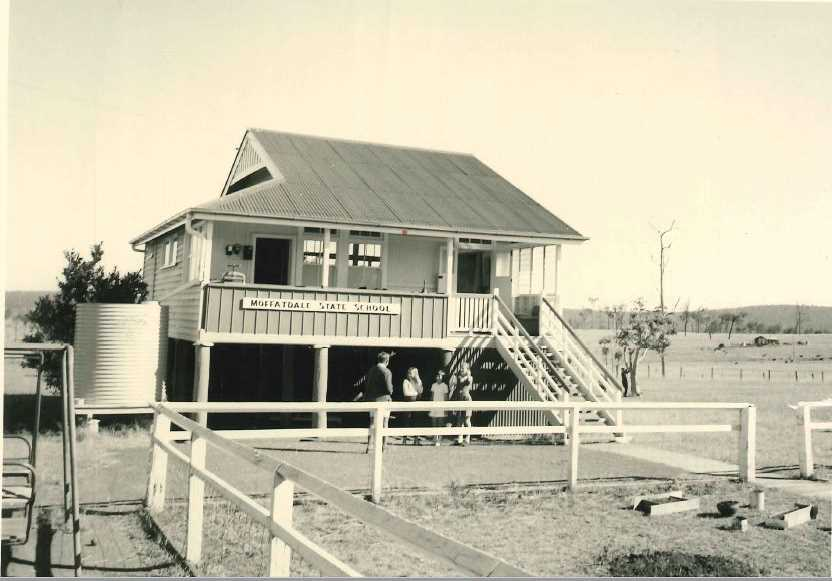
Original school building at Moffatdale State School, 1973

Caulfield Provisional School opened on 1 November 1915 with 11 students under teacher Miss Elise Ellen Bow. In 1916, it was renamed Barambah West Provisional School and again in 1918 as Moffatdale Provisional School. On 1 June 1926, it became Moffatdale State School. The school celebrated its 50th anniversary in October 1965 with 5 of its first-day students in attendance. The school celebrated its 75th anniversary on 27 October 1990 with nearly 500 former students and teachers in attendance. The school celebrated its centenary in 2015 with the publication of a school centenary history book. At that time, the school had an enrolment of 53 students and the original school building was still on site, but was being used as an office.

== Demographics ==
In the 2016 census, Moffatdale had a population of 179 people.

In the 2021 census, Moffatdale had a population of 257 people.

== Education ==
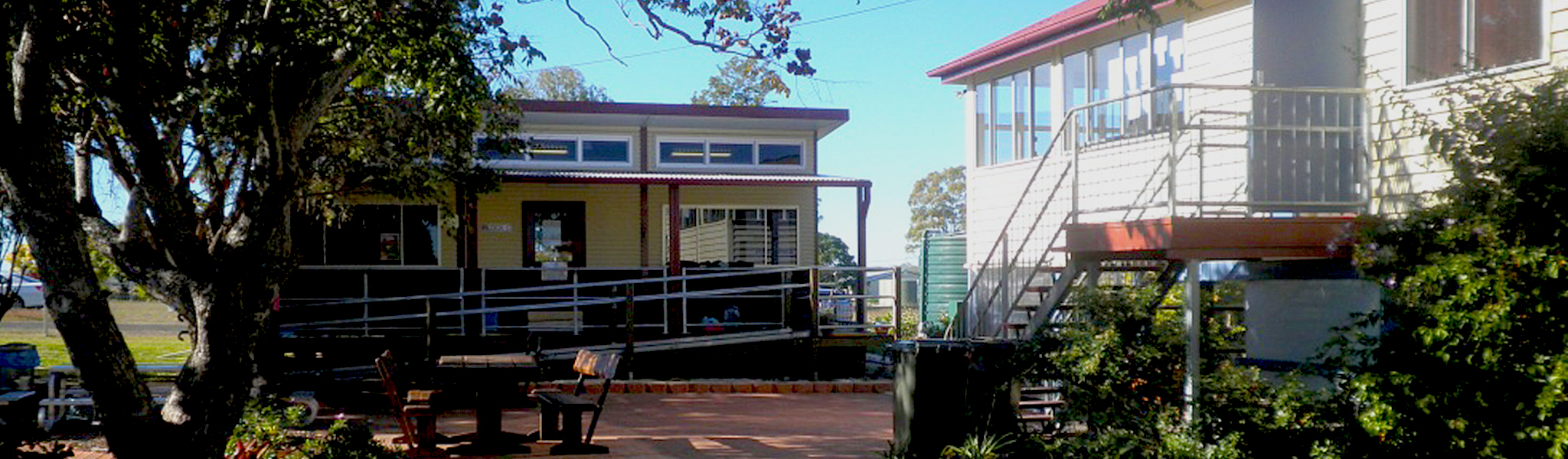
Moffatdale State School, 2024

Moffatdale State School is a government primary (Prep-6) school for boys and girls at 892 Barambah Road (26.3059°S 152.0117°E). In 2018, the school had an enrolment of 42 students with 5 teachers (4 full-time equivalent) and 6 non-teaching staff (4 full-time equivalent).

There is no secondary school in Moffatdale. The nearest government secondary school is Murgon State High School in neighbouring Murgon to the north-west.

== Amenities ==
There are two boat ramps into Lake Barambah known as:

- Bjelke-Petersen Dam (West) (26.3059°S 151.9820°E)
- Bjelke-Petersen Dam (East) (26.3063°S 151.9928°E)

Both are on Haager Drive and are managed by the South Burnett Regional Council.
