= Electoral district of Nanango =

State electoral district of Queensland, Australia

Nanango Queensland—Legislative Assembly
- Electoral map of Nanango, 2017
- State: Queensland
- MP: Deb Frecklington
- Party: Liberal National
- Namesake: Nanango
- Electors: 37,170 (2020)
- Area: 18,122 km^{2} (6,996.9 sq mi)
- Demographic: Rural
- Coordinates: 26°56′S 151°56′E
Electorates around Nanango:
Callide	Callide	Maryborough
Warrego	Nanango	Gympie; Glass House
Condamine	Lockyer	Moggill; Pine Rivers

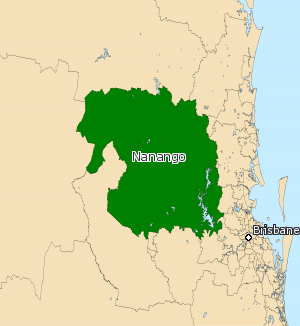
Electoral map of Nanango, 2008

Nanango is an electoral district in the state of Queensland, Australia. Notable towns include Nanango, Kingaroy and Crows Nest. Since 2012 it has been held by former Opposition Leader Deb Frecklington of the Liberal National Party, who has served as Attorney-General of Queensland, Minister for Justice and Minister for Integrity since 2024.

== History ==
The electoral district has existed twice. It was first created in 1912, and was replaced by Barambah in 1950. It was recreated in 2001, as a replacement for Barambah.

Nanango was the original seat of Sir Joh Bjelke-Petersen (from 1947 to 1950).

The seat has never been won by the Labor Party in either of its incarnations; indeed, counting its history as Barambah (which covered essentially the same area), it has been in the hands of a conservative party or a conservative independent for over a century.

== Members for Nanango ==
First incarnation (1912–1950)
Member	Party	Term
Robert Hodge	Farmers' Union	1912–1920
Jim Edwards	Farmers' Union/Country	1920–1947
Joh Bjelke-Petersen	Country	1947–1950
Second incarnation (2001–present)
Member	Party	Term
Dorothy Pratt	Independent	2001–2012
Deb Frecklington	Liberal National	2012–present

== Election results ==
2024 Queensland state election: Nanango
Party	Candidate	Votes	%	±%
Liberal National	Deb Frecklington	19,319	55.27	+5.37
Labor	Val Heward	6,071	17.37	−10.33
One Nation	Adam Maslen	4,210	12.05	−2.65
Independent	Jason Miles	1,892	5.41	−0.89
Legalise Cannabis	Anthony Hopkins	1,350	3.86	−0.34
Greens	Angus Ryan	1,120	3.21	−0.29
Family First	Benjamin Mitchell	693	1.98	+1.98
Independent	Nathan Hope	295	0.85	+0.85
Total formal votes		34,952	95.85	
Informal votes		1,514	4.15	
Turnout		36,466	88.77	
Two-party-preferred result
Liberal National	Deb Frecklington	25,488	72.92	+10.72
Labor	Val Heward	7,755	27.08	−10.72
Liberal National hold		Swing	+10.72	

Primary vote results in Nanango (Parties that have never gotten 5% of the vote are omitted)
Labor
National/Liberal National
One Nation
Katter's Australian
Greens
Palmer United/United Australia Party
Independent
View source data.
Two-candidate-preferred vote results in Nanango View source data.
