= Warnung =

- Suburb
- Interactive map of Warnung
- Coordinates: 26.1538°S 151.8386°E
- Country: Australia
- State: Queensland
- LGA: South Burnett Region
- Location: 16.5 km (10.3 mi) NW of Murgon; 52.3 km (32.5 mi) N of Kingaroy; 112 km (70 mi) W of Gympie; 279 km (173 mi) NNW of Brisbane

Government
  - State electorate: Nanango
  - Federal division: Wide Bay

Area
  - Total: 9.4 km^{2} (3.6 sq mi)

Population
  - Total: 6 (2021 census)
  - Density: 0.64/km^{2} (1.65/sq mi)
- Time zone: UTC+10:00 (AEST)
- Postcode: 4605
Suburbs around Warnung
Cloyna	Cloyna	Merlwood
Silverleaf	Warnung	Merlwood
Silverleaf	Silverleaf	Byee

Warnung is a rural locality in the South Burnett Region, Queensland, Australia. In the 2021 census, Warnung had a population of 6 people.

== Geography ==
The Murgon Gayndah Road enters the locality from the north-east (Merlwood) and forms part of the locality's northern boundary before exiting to the north (Cloyna).

The land use is predominantly grazing on native vegetation with some crop growing.

== History ==
The locality's name came from the Warnung railway station on the Windera railway line (approx 26.1523°S 151.8405°E). The which was named by the Queensland Railways Department on 18 March 1924. It is an Aboriginal word referring to a species of Eucalyptus known as box trees.

On Saturday 28 March 1925, the 12-mile (19 km) railway line from Barlil to Windera was officially opened by Alfred James Jones, the Minister for Mines and formerly the Member of the Queensland Legislative Assembly for Burnett. The line passed through stations at Warnung, Cloyna, and Kitoba. Despite handling regular pig and cream traffic plus occasional livestock, the line's existence was never really justified. The uneconomic branch line closed from 1 July 1961.

== Demographics ==
In the 2016 census, Warnung had a population of 11 people.

In the 2021 census, Warnung had a population of 6 people.

== Education ==
There are no schools in Warnung. The nearest government primary schools are Cloyna State School in neighbouring Cloyna to the north and Wheatlands State School in Wheatlands to the south. The nearest government secondary school is Murgon State High School in Murgon to the south-west. There is also a Catholic primary school in Murgon.
