= Merlwood =

- Suburb
- Interactive map of Merlwood
- Coordinates: 26.1494°S 151.8830°E
- Country: Australia
- State: Queensland
- LGA: South Burnett Region
- Location: 14.5 km (9.0 mi) NW of Murgon; 53.7 km (33.4 mi) N of Kingaroy; 106 km (66 mi) W of Gympie; 272 km (169 mi) NW of Brisbane

Government
  - State electorate: Nanango
  - Federal division: Wide Bay

Area
  - Total: 23.3 km^{2} (9.0 sq mi)

Population
  - Total: 104 (2021 census)
  - Density: 4.464/km^{2} (11.56/sq mi)
- Time zone: UTC+10:00 (AEST)
- Postcode: 4605
Suburbs around Merlwood
Cloyna	Sunny Nook	Sunny Nook
Warnung	Merlwood	Tablelands
Byee	Barlil	Oakdale

Merlwood is a rural locality in the South Burnett Region, Queensland, Australia. In the 2021 census, Merlwood had a population of 104 people.

== Geography ==
The Murgon–Gayndah Road enters the locality from the south-east (Barlil / Oakdale), then north towards the centre of the locality and then west, exiting to the west (Cloyna / Warnung).

The land use is mostly grazing on native vegetation with some crop growing.

== History ==
Merlwood State School opened on 23 March 1910 under teacher Alice Amelia Wilson. It closed on 22 January 1967. It was located on the north-west corner of Pringle Hill Road and Eisenmengers Road (26.1508°S 151.8888°E), just north of the Gayndah Road.

A Methodist church was built in 1912 opposite the state school on the north-east corner of Pringle Hill Road and Eisenmengers Road (26.1513°S 151.8895°E). The building was later removed when the church closed in 1975. This church was strongly supported by a prominent local family who were among the first settlers, the Shelton family.

There was a cemetery in Merlwood with a proposal to appoint cemetery trustees published in 1911 and a newspaper record of a child buried there in 1928, that of Sydney Kerle who was bitten by a death adder. Its location has been confirmed on historic cadastral maps as being in the vicinity of present-day Richard's Road, occupying the south-western corner of Portion 192, later becoming Portion 252. Two children from the Shelton family were also buried there, Dorothy Joan in 1915 and Lois in 1928.It eventually closed in 1934 when the original 5-acre site was reduced to 2 perches as Lot 252, and this was later cancelled as a distinct land portion in 1970. There are possibly no physical traces of it remaining at the actual site as it is unmarked on modern maps and the total number of actual burials is unknown. Sydney Kerle was exhumed in 1932 and reinterred at nearby Murgon cemetery.

A recreation reserve was established in 1913 with a board of local trustees, on land that was originally designated as a water reserve, adjoining the site of Merlwood State School. Clearing and fencing was undertaken over the years that followed and a cricket pitch created. Harry Shelton kept records of the trustees. It is unknown what became of the recreation grounds in later years.

== Demographics ==
In the 2016 census, Merlwood had a population of 88 people.

In the 2021 census, Merlwood had a population of 104 people.

== Education ==
There are no schools in Merlwood. The nearest government primary schools are Cloyna State School in neighbouring Cloyna to the north-west, Wheatlands State School in Wheatlands to the south, and Murgon State School in Murgon to the south-east. The nearest government secondary school is Murgon State High School in Murgon.
