= Keysland =

- Suburb
- Interactive map of Keysland
- Coordinates: 26.2136°S 151.7427°E
- Country: Australia
- State: Queensland
- LGA: South Burnett Region
- Location: 16.8 km (10.4 mi) SE of Proston; 23.4 km (14.5 mi) NW of Wondai; 28.0 km (17.4 mi) N of Murgon; 48.8 km (30.3 mi) WNW of Kingaroy; 261 km (162 mi) NW of Brisbane

Government
  - State electorate: Nanango
  - Federal division: Flynn

Area
  - Total: 11.6 km^{2} (4.5 sq mi)

Population
  - Total: 19 (2021 census)
  - Density: 1.64/km^{2} (4.24/sq mi)
- Time zone: UTC+10:00 (AEST)
- Postcode: 4612
Suburbs around Keysland
| Kawl Kawl | Kawl Kawl | Mondure |
| Mount McEuen | Keysland | Mondure |
| Mount McEuen | Mount McEuen | Leafdale |

Keysland is a rural locality in the South Burnett Region, Queensland, Australia. In the 2021 census, Keysland had a population of 19 people.

== Geography ==
The land use in Keysland includes cropping, horticultural, plantation forestry, but is predominantly grazing on native vegetation.

== History ==
The name of the district is presumed to derived from the surname of an early settler, Eric John Keys, who was resident in the district circa 1913 to circa 1959.

Keysland State School opened on 11 May 1915 and closed on 31 December 1974. It was on the south-western corner of Wondai Proston Road and Kayes Road (26.2147°S 151.7423°E). It provided primary school education to children residing in the localities of Keysland, Kawl Kawl and Mount McEuen.

== Demographics ==
In the 2016 census, Keysland had a population of 12 people.

In the 2021 census, Keysland had a population of 19 people.

== Education ==
There are no schools in Keysland. The nearest government primary schools are Wheatlands State School in Wheatlands to the east and Proston State School in Proston to the north-west. The nearest government secondary schools are Proston State School (to Year 10) and Murgon State High School (to Year 12) in Murgon to the east.
