= Kawl Kawl, Queensland =

Kawl Kawl
- Suburb
- Interactive map of Kawl Kawl
- Coordinates: 26.1802°S 151.7275°E
- Country: Australia
- State: Queensland
- LGA: South Burnett Region
- Location: 26.2 km (16.3 mi) NW of Murgon; 52.5 km (32.6 mi) N of Kingaroy; 118 km (73 mi) W of Gympie; 274 km (170 mi) NNW of Brisbane

Government
  - State electorate: Nanango
  - Federal division: Flynn

Area
  - Total: 16.8 km^{2} (6.5 sq mi)
- Elevation: 280–420 m (920–1,380 ft)

Population
  - Total: 24 (2021 census)
  - Density: 1.43/km^{2} (3.70/sq mi)
- Time zone: UTC+10:00 (AEST)
- Postcode: 4612
Suburbs around Kawl Kawl
Hivesville	Stonelands	Marshlands
Hivesville	Kawl Kawl	Mondure
Mount McEuen	Keysland	Keysland

Kawl Kawl is a rural locality in the South Burnett Region, Queensland, Australia. In the 2021 census, Kawl Kawl had a population of 24 people.

== Geography ==
The land use is predominantly grazing on native vegetation with some crop growing.

== History ==
The locality takes its name from the former Kawl Kawl railway station (26.1787°S 151.7368°E), which in turn was assigned on 18 January 1917 and is an Aboriginal word meaning scrub magpie.

Kawl Kawl made national news in multiple newspapers in 1924 following the suspected suicide by drinking sheep dip, of local resident Miss Nona Agnes Hilleary, aged 18 (incorrectly reported as Mona Agnes Hilleary at the time). She was said to be love sick following her father's instructions to stay away from the young man concerned.

The Courier-Mail reported on 30 April 1937 that "A cyclonic storm at Kawl Kawl station, on the Proston railway, on Wednesday night, was accompanied by heavy hail, and 2in. of rain fell in a quarter of an hour. Mr. W. Peters's residence was unroofed, and all the windows were smashed in Mr. A. Marquardt's premises. Large trees were uprooted, and crops flattened".

== Demographics ==
In the 2016 census, Kawl Kawl had a population of 18 people.

In the 2021 census, Kawl Kawl had a population of 24 people.

== Education ==
There are no schools in Kawl Kawl. The nearest government primary schools are Proston State School in Proston to the north-west, Cloyna State School in Cloyna to the north-east, and Wheatlands State School in Wheatlands to the south-east. The nearest government secondary schools are Proston State School (to Year 10) and Murgon State High School (to Year 12) in Murgon to the south-east.
