= Byee, Queensland =

Byee
- Suburb
- Interactive map of Byee
- Coordinates: 26.1838°S 151.8513°E
- Country: Australia
- State: Queensland
- LGA: South Burnett Region
- Location: 13.2 km (8.2 mi) NW of Murgon; 51.3 km (31.9 mi) N of Kingaroy; 269 km (167 mi) NNW of Brisbane

Government
  - State electorate: Nanango
  - Federal division: Wide Bay

Area
  - Total: 15.1 km^{2} (5.8 sq mi)

Population
  - Total: 39 (2021 census)
  - Density: 2.58/km^{2} (6.69/sq mi)
- Time zone: UTC+10:00 (AEST)
- Postcode: 4605
Suburbs around Byee
Silverleaf	Warnung	Merlwood
Silverleaf	Byee	Barlil
Wheatlands	Wheatlands	Wheatlands

Byee is a rural locality in the South Burnett Region, Queensland, Australia. In the 2021 census, Byee had a population of 39 people.

== History ==
The district name was chosen by the Queensland Railways Department in 1915 when plans for the Murgon to Proston branch line were approved and under development. The word Byee is derived from Aboriginal origin with connotations meaning silver leaf ironbark tree.

The branch railway from Murgon to Proston opened on 25 February 1923, with Byee the second station on the route after Barlil, although some services to Byee functioned prior to the entire line opening as that section had been completed. A mixed service was provided three times a week between 1938 and 1964 utilising a rail motor service operated to and from Gympie. In 1924 it was reported that the local Byee storekeeper Mr. W.J.Wrigely had been appointed postmaster, and also that the telegraph and telephone office was functioning, and that land had been reserved for the purpose of building a hotel (which never eventuated)

A public hall was established at Byee in 1929 on land donated by E.D. Quinlan and was funded by local donations and fundraising efforts such as a dance held in the barn of a nearby property owned by A. Sempf. The hall became a popular local venue for regular dances and social functions. The district had its own soccer and cricket teams which competed in South Burnett fixtures.

Telephone infrastructure was first extended to Byee in 1923 and was based at the local railway station which itself was only new.

A small village developed in Byee which included a shop, receiving depots and later, grain silos. Most business revolved around the functions of the railway.

The railway line was progressively closed with Byee not serviced from 1999. The Byee railway station is now abandoned (26.1899°S 151.8525°E).

== Demographics ==
In the 2016 census, Byee had a population of 31 people.

In the 2021 census, Byee had a population of 39 people.

== Education ==
There are no schools in Byee. The nearest government primary schools are Wheatlands State School in neighbouring Wheatlands to the south and Murgon State School in Murgon to the south-east. The nearest government secondary school is Murgon State High School in Murgon to the south-east.
