= Oakdale, Queensland =

Oakdale
- Suburb
- Interactive map of Oakdale
- Coordinates: 26.2000°S 151.9127°E
- Country: Australia
- State: Queensland
- LGA: South Burnett Region
- Location: 6.0 km (3.7 mi) NW of Murgon; 48.2 km (30.0 mi) N of Kingaroy; 98.2 km (61.0 mi) W of Gympie; 269 km (167 mi) NNW of Brisbane

Government
  - State electorate: Nanango
  - Federal division: Wide Bay

Area
  - Total: 10.9 km^{2} (4.2 sq mi)

Population
  - Total: 49 (2021 census)
  - Density: 4.50/km^{2} (11.64/sq mi)
- Time zone: UTC+10:00 (AEST)
- Postcode: 4605
Suburbs around Oakdale
Merlwood	Tablelands	Tablelands
Barlil	Oakdale	Murgon
Barlil	Murgon	Murgon

Oakdale is a rural locality in the South Burnett Region, Queensland, Australia. In the 2021 census, Oakdale had a population of 49 people.

== Geography ==
The Murgon - Gayndah Road enters the locality from the north-west (Merlwood) and forms part of the north-western boundary of the locality, before passing through the locality, to become part of the southern boundary, before exiting to the south (Murgon).

The land use is mostly grazing on native vegetation with some crop growing and some rural residential housing.

== History ==
The locality was officially named and bounded on 29 May 1998.

Tenders to build a school at Oakdale were called in January 1916. Oakdale State School opened on 10 August 1916. It closed about 30 September 1941. It was on a 5-acre (2.0 ha) site on the north-east corner of Gessler and Crownthorpe Roads (26.1989°S 151.9102°E).

== Demographics ==
In the 2016 census, Oakdale had a population of 56 people.

In the 2021 census, Oakdale had a population of 49 people.

== Education ==
There are no schools in Oakdale. The nearest government primary and secondary schools are Murgon State School and Murgon State High School in neighbouring Murgon to the south-east. There is also a Catholic primary school in Murgon.
