= Marshlands, Queensland =

Marshlands
- Suburb
- Interactive map of Marshlands
- Coordinates: 26.1538°S 151.7572°E
- Country: Australia
- State: Queensland
- LGA: South Burnett Region
- Location: 17.4 km (10.8 mi) E of Proston; 25.8 km (16.0 mi) NW of Murgon; 118 km (73 mi) W of Gympie; 195 km (121 mi) SW of Bundaberg CBD; 292 km (181 mi) NNW of Brisbane

Government
  - State electorate: Nanango
  - Federal division: Wide Bay

Area
  - Total: 18.9 km^{2} (7.3 sq mi)

Population
  - Total: 23 (2021 census)
  - Density: 1.217/km^{2} (3.15/sq mi)
- Time zone: UTC+10:00 (AEST)
- Postcode: 4611
Suburbs around Marshlands
Wooroonden	Wooroonden	Silverleaf
Stonelands	Marshlands	Silverleaf
Kawl Kawl	Mondure	Mondure

Marshlands is a rural locality in the South Burnett Region, Queensland, Australia. In the 2021 census, Marshlands had a population of 23 people.

== Geography ==
Barambah Creek enters the locality from the south-east (Mondure / Silverleaf) and forms the north-eastern and northern boundary of the locality, before exiting to the north-west (Stonelands / Wooroonden). It is ultimately a tributary of the Burnett River.

The Marshlands rural property is in the south of the locality.

The land use is a mixture of crop-growing and grazing on native vegetation.

== Demographics ==
In the 2016 census, Marshlands had a population of 14 people.

In the 2021 census, Marshlands had a population of 23 people.

== Education ==
There are no schools in Marshlands. The nearest government schools are Cloyna State School in Cloyna to the north-east and Wheatlands State School in Wheatlands to the south-east. The nearest government secondary schools are Proston State School (to Year 10) in Proston to the west and Murgon State High School (to Year 12) in Murgon to the south-east. There is also a Catholic primary school in Murgon.
