= Tablelands, Queensland (South Burnett Region) =

Tablelands
- Suburb
- Interactive map of Tablelands
- Coordinates: 26.1616°S 151.9425°E
- Country: Australia
- State: Queensland
- LGA: South Burnett Region
- Location: 10.7 km (6.6 mi) N of Murgon; 52.9 km (32.9 mi) NNW of Kingaroy; 92.9 km (57.7 mi) W of Gympie; 268 km (167 mi) NNW of Brisbane

Government
  - State electorate: Nanango
  - Federal division: Wide Bay

Area
  - Total: 40.3 km^{2} (15.6 sq mi)
- Elevation: 500 m (1,600 ft)

Population
  - Total: 116 (2021 census)
  - Density: 2.878/km^{2} (7.46/sq mi)
- Time zone: UTC+10:00 (AEST)
- Postcode: 4605
Suburbs around Tablelands
Sunny Nook	Crownthorpe	Goomeribong
Merlwood	Tablelands	Manyung
Oakdale	Murgon	Murgon

Tablelands is a rural locality in the South Burnett Region, Queensland, Australia. In the 2021 census, Tablelands had a population of 116 people.

== Geography ==
Boat Mountain is in the east of the locality (26.1573°S 151.9764°E), rising to 587 metres (1,926 ft) above sea level. It was named for its resemblance to an upturned boat.

== Demographics ==
In the 2016 census, Tablelands had a population of 100 people.

In the 2021 census, Tablelands had a population of 116 people.

== Education ==
There are no schools in Tablelands. The nearest government primary schools are Murgon State School in neighbouring Murgon to the south, Cloyna State School in Cloyna to the north-west, and Goomeri State School in Goomeri to the east. The nearest government secondary schools are Murgon State High School (to Year 12) in Murgon and Goomeri State School (to Year 10).
