= Proston railway line =

Former railway line in Queensland, Australia

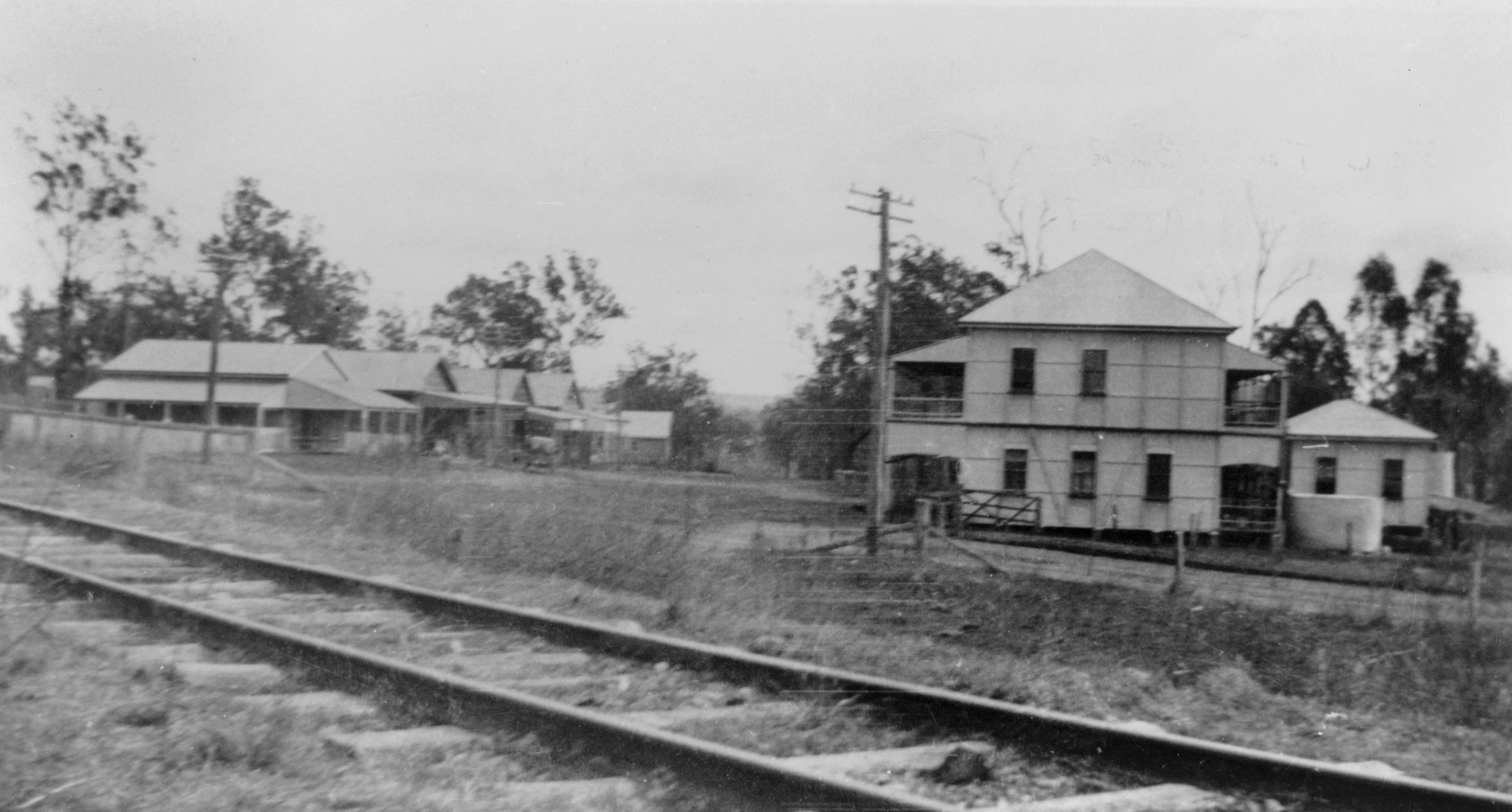
- Proston railway line, Hivesville, circa 1930

Overview
- Locale: Queensland, Australia
- Termini: Murgon; Proston
- Stations: 10

History
- Opened: 24 February 1923
- Closed: 25 January 1993

Technical
- Track gauge: 3 ft 6 in (1,067 mm)

The Proston railway line was a branch railway from Murgon to Proston in south-east Queensland, Australia.

== History ==
On 7 December 1914 Queensland Parliament approved a branch line to run west from Murgon to Proston in south-east Queensland. Although construction began in late 1915, a shortage of rails and the impact of the war impeded progress and, after suspending work in 1920 for some two years, the line opened on 24 February 1923. Stops were established at Barlil, Byee, Gueena, Mondure, Kawl Kawl, Hivesville and Kinleymore en route to Proston. The villages of Byee and Mondure can attribute their existence to the establishment of the line, however Hivesville was already an established centre by the time of construction, predating it by at least a decade and it subsequently became a thriving service centre for the district in the immediate years after the line's opening. Proston township developed around the site of the terminus of the line from 1923 and in later years prior to the war it overtook Hivesville in size and importance. During part of the construction phase, a state school operated in a tent along the track-side for labourers' children. It was known as the Proston Construction Camp Provisional School (1917–18) and moved with the camp location. It is believed to have been located mostly within the vicinity of Hivesville.

The Windera railway line branched off at Barlil and terminated at Windera and was opened on 28 March 1925. It was approximately 12 miles (19 km) long.

A mixed service was provided three times a week between 1938 and 1964 utilising a rail motor service operated to and from Gympie. Proston timber mill and butter factory accessed the line until both closed and only spasmodic grain traffic continued until line closure. The thirty kilometre section between Byee and Proston was closed on 25 January 1993 and from Barlil to Byee was suspended in May 1999. The branch line from Barlil to Windera was closed on 1 July 1961.
