= Silverleaf, Queensland =

Silverleaf
- Suburb
- Interactive map of Silverleaf
- Coordinates: 26.1680°S 151.8025°E
- Country: Australia
- State: Queensland
- LGA: South Burnett Region
- Location: 15.6 km (9.7 mi) NW of Murgon; 51.3 km (31.9 mi) N of Kingaroy; 107 km (66 mi) W of Gympie; 262 km (163 mi) NW of Brisbane

Government
  - State electorate: Nanango
  - Federal divisions: Wide Bay; Flynn

Area
  - Total: 33.7 km^{2} (13.0 sq mi)

Population
  - Total: 73 (2021 census)
  - Density: 2.166/km^{2} (5.61/sq mi)
- Time zone: UTC+10:00 (AEST)
- Postcode: 4605
Suburbs around Silverleaf
Wooroonden; Marshlands	Cloyna	Warnung
Mondure	Silverleaf	Byee
Leafdale	Chelmsford	Wheatlands

Silverleaf is a rural locality in the South Burnett Region, Queensland, Australia. In the 2021 census, Silverleaf had a population of 73 people.

== History ==
Silverleaf State School opened on 30 September 1912 and closed 28 January 1963. It was on Silverleaf Road (approx 26.17118°S 151.82078°E).

== Demographics ==
In the 2016 census, Silverleaf had a population of 57 people.

In the 2021 census, Silverleaf had a population of 73 people.

== Education ==
There are no schools in Silverleaf. The nearest government primary schools are Cloyna State School in neighbouring Cloyna to the north and Wheatlands State School in neighbouring Wheatlands to the south-east. The nearest government secondary schools are Murgon State High School (to Year 12) in Murgon to the east, Wondai State School (to Year 9) in Wondai to the south-east, and Proston State School (to Year 10) in Proston to the west.
