= Marshland (disambiguation) =

Marshland is a low-lying and seasonally waterlogged land.

Marshland may also refer to:

- Marshland (film), 2014 Spanish film
- Marshlands, Queensland
- Marshland, New Zealand
- Marshland Rural District, a former district of Norfolk, England
