= Ficks Crossing, Queensland =

Ficks Crossing
- Suburb
- Interactive map of Ficks Crossing
- Coordinates: 26.265°S 151.8927°E
- Country: Australia
- State: Queensland
- LGA: South Burnett Region
- Location: 6.9 km (4.3 mi) W of Murgon; 38.4 km (23.9 mi) NNE of Kingaroy; 98.8 km (61.4 mi) W of Gympie; 271 km (168 mi) NNW of Brisbane

Government
  - State electorate: Nanango
  - Federal division: Flynn

Area
  - Total: 13.9 km^{2} (5.4 sq mi)

Population
  - Total: 39 (2021 census)
  - Density: 2.81/km^{2} (7.27/sq mi)
- Time zone: UTC+10:00 (AEST)
- Postcode: 4606
Suburbs around Ficks Crossing
Wheatlands	Wheatlands	Murgon
Wondai	Ficks Crossing	Murgon
Wondai	Cherbourg	Cherbourg

Ficks Crossing is a rural locality in the South Burnett Region, Queensland, Australia. In the 2021 census, Ficks Crossing had a population of 39 people.

== Geography ==
Barambah Creek loosely bounds the locality to the north-east and east, while its tributary Yellow Waterhole Creek loosely bounds the locality to the south-east.

The Bunya Highway enters the locality from the north-east (Murgon), crossing Barambah Creek on the John Krebs Bridge (26.24149°S 151.89428°E), and exits to the west (Wondai).

The land use is predominantly grazing on native vegetation.

== History ==
The locality presumably takes its name from the Ficks Crossing ford over Barambah Creek (26.26500°S 151.89278°E). The low-level bridge was constructed over the creek at the crossing in 1917. The approaches to the bridge were carried away by flood water in 1923. In 1935, ongoing problems with the low-level bridge resulted in a request to the Queensland Government to build a high-level bridge. A weir for irrigation just upstream of the crossing was also proposed.

Ficks Crossing National Fitness Camp operated at 47 Ficks Crossing Road from 1980 to 2008.

The Silver Lining School in Ficks Crossing was established in 2019 with a program for young men. In 2021, a program for young women was introduced.

== Demographics ==
In the 2016 census, Ficks Crossing had a population of 37 people.

In the 2021 census, Ficks Crossing had a population of 39 people.

== Education ==
Silver Lining School is a private secondary school for boys and girls at 14722 Bunya Highway (26.26060°S 151.88799°E). It is operated by the Silver Lining Foundation, an organisation dedicated to the education and training of Indigenous young people who suffer from social disadvantage to give them a sense of purpose. The school draws most of its students from neighbouring Cherbourg. In 2022, the school had 22 students in the young men's program and 13 students in the young women's program.

The nearest government primary schools are Wheatlands State School in neighbouring Wheatlands to the north-west, Murgon State School in neighbouring Murgon to the east, and Wondai State School in neighbouring Wondai to the south-west. The nearest government secondary schools are Wondai State School (to Year 9) and Murgon State High School (to Year 12), also in Murgon.

== Attractions ==
There is a waterhole on Barambah Creek offering opportunities for fishing, kayaking, and picnics. It is accessed from Ficks Crossing Road (26.25332°S 151.89263°E).
