= Glenrock, Queensland =

Glenrock
- Suburb
- Interactive map of Glenrock
- Coordinates: 26.0788°S 151.7833°E
- Country: Australia
- State: Queensland
- LGA: South Burnett Region
- Location: 27.2 km (16.9 mi) NNW of Murgon; 63.2 km (39.3 mi) N of Kingaroy; 119 km (74 mi) W of Gympie; 285 km (177 mi) NNW of Brisbane

Government
  - State electorate: Nanango
  - Federal division: Wide Bay

Area
  - Total: 39.9 km^{2} (15.4 sq mi)

Population
  - Total: 35 (2021 census)
  - Density: 0.877/km^{2} (2.27/sq mi)
- Time zone: UTC+10:00 (AEST)
- Postcode: 4605
Suburbs around Glenrock
Windera	Windera	Windera
Stonelands	Glenrock	Windera
Wooroonden	Cloyna	Cloyna

Glenrock is a rural locality in the South Burnett Region, Queensland, Australia. In the 2021 census, Glenrock had a population of 35 people.

== Geography ==
The Woroon National Park is in the north-west of the locality. Apart from this protected area, the land use is predominantly grazing on native vegetation with some crop growing in the east of the locality.

== History ==
Glenrock State School opened on 15 April 1926 and closed in December 1966. It was at 106 Glenrock Road (corner of Louttits Road, 26.10136°S 151.79955°E).

Wooroon National Park was originally part of the Wooroon State Forest. In 1996, an area of 57 hectares (140 acres) was set aside to protect a semi-evergreen vine thicket, which was becoming increasingly rare. In 2006, it was gazetted as a national park.

== Demographics ==
In the 2016 census, Glenrock had a population of 40 people.

In the 2021 census, Glenrock had a population of 35 people.

== Education ==
There are no schools in Glenrock. The nearest government primary schools are Windera State School in neighbouring Windera to the north-east and Cloyna State School in neighbouring Cloyna to the south-east. The nearest government secondary schools are Proston State School (to Year 10) in Proston to the south-west and Murgon State High School (to Year 12) in Murgon to the south-east.
