= Kitoba =

- Suburb
- Interactive map of Kitoba
- Coordinates: 26.0599°S 151.8686°E
- Country: Australia
- State: Queensland
- LGA: South Burnett Region
- Location: 29.2 km (18.1 mi) NNW of Murgon; 68.3 km (42.4 mi) N of Kingaroy; 121 km (75 mi) WNW of Gympie; 285 km (177 mi) NNW of Brisbane]

Government
  - State electorate: Nanango
  - Federal division: Wide Bay

Area
  - Total: 33.3 km^{2} (12.9 sq mi)

Population
  - Total: 17 (2021 census)
  - Density: 0.511/km^{2} (1.32/sq mi)
- Time zone: UTC+10:00 (AEST)
- Postcode: 4605
Suburbs around Kitoba
Windera	Windera	Booubyjan
Windera	Kitoba	Cobbs Hill
Cloyna	Cloyna	Sunny Nook

Kitoba is a rural locality in the South Burnett Region, Queensland, Australia. In the 2021 census, Kitoba had a population of 17 people.

== Geography ==
The Murgon Gayndah Road enters the locality from the south-west (Cloyna) and exits to the west (Windera).

The locality is within the catchment of the Burnett River within the North East Coast drainage basin.

The land use is predominantly grazing on native vegetation with some crop growing and plantation forestry.

== History ==
The locality takes its name from the Kitoba railway station name, which was named on 3 July 1926 by the Queensland Railways Department. The name Kitoba is thought to be an Aboriginal word referring to paint stone (possibly in connection with body painting). The station was previously known as Boolel, another Aboriginal word, meaning silver leafed ironbark tree. The station was to the west of the junction of Gayndah Murgon Road and Kitoba Road on the Windera railway line (approx 26.0762°S 151.8408°E). The railway line closed in 1961.

The Anglican Church of the Holy Trinity was opened on 24 May 1957 by Archdeacon Richards. It was closed on 3 June 2005 by Assistant Bishop Nolan. The church was at 2272 Gayndah Road (26.08746°S 151.8364°E) until 2007 when the church building was relocated to Cloyna State School.

== Demographics ==
In the 2016 census, Kitoba had a population of 13 people.

In the 2021 census, Kitoba had a population of 17 people.

== Education ==
There are no schools in Kitoba. The nearest government primary schools are Windera State School in neighbouring Windera to the west and Cloyna State School in neighbouring Cloyna to the south. The nearest government secondary school is Murgon State High School in Murgon to the south-east. There is also a Catholic primary school in Murgon.
