= Barlil =

- Suburb
- Interactive map of Barlil
- Coordinates: 26.2097°S 151.8905°E
- Country: Australia
- State: Queensland
- LGA: South Burnett Region
- Location: 8.1 km (5.0 mi) NW of Murgon; 46.6 km (29.0 mi) N of Kingaroy; 99.9 km (62.1 mi) W of Gympie; 255 km (158 mi) NW of Brisbane

Government
  - State electorate: Nanango
  - Federal divisions: Wide Bay; Flynn

Area
  - Total: 12.6 km^{2} (4.9 sq mi)

Population
  - Total: 46 (2021 census)
  - Density: 3.65/km^{2} (9.46/sq mi)
- Time zone: UTC+10:00 (AEST)
- Postcode: 4605
Suburbs around Barlil
Byee	Merlwood	Oakdale
Wheatlands	Barlil	Oakdale
Wheatlands	Murgon	Murgon

Barlil is a rural locality in the South Burnett Region, Queensland, Australia. In the 2021 census, Barlil had a population of 46 people.

== Geography ==
Barlil was on the Murgon-to-Proston railway line with the locality served by the now-abandoned Barlil railway station (26.1983°S 151.8813°E). At Barlil, the Windera railway line branched off towards Windera. Both lines are now closed.

== History ==
The locality's name is taken from the railway station name, which is an Aboriginal word meaning bend in a river, assigned by the Queensland Railways Department on 30 August 1923.

On Saturday 28 March 1925, the railway line from Barlil to Windera was officially opened by Alfred James Jones, the Minister for Mines and formerly the Member of the Queensland Legislative Assembly for Burnett.

Barlil State School opened on 15 September 1925. It closed in 1963. The school was located at 342 Paul Holznagel Road (just north of Silverleaf Road, 26.1940°S 151.8757°E). It provided primary school education for children residing in the immediate Barlil district, the town of Byee and nearby districts of Warnung and Gueena.

== Demographics ==
In the 2016 census, Barlil had a population of 37 people.

In the 2021 census, Barlil had a population of 46 people.

== Education ==
There are no schools in Barlil. The nearest government primary schools are Murgon State School in neighbouring Murgon to the south-east and Wheatlands State School in neighbouring Wheatlands to the south-west. The nearest government secondary school is Murgon State High School, also in Murgon to the south-east.
