= Mondure =

- Town
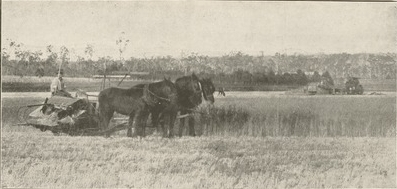
- Reaping the wheat, Keleher brothers farm, North Mondure, 1919

- Interactive map of Mondure
- Coordinates: 26.1803°S 151.7735°E
- Country: Australia
- State: Queensland
- LGA: South Burnett Region
- Location: 20.4 km (12.7 mi) NNW of Wondai; 21.6 km (13.4 mi) WNW of Murgon; 48.4 km (30.1 mi) N of Kingaroy; 202 km (126 mi) N of Toowoomba; 271 km (168 mi) NW of Brisbane
- Established: 1844

Government
  - State electorate: Nanango
  - Federal division: Flynn

Area
  - Total: 23.8 km^{2} (9.2 sq mi)

Population
  - Total: 102 (2021 census)
  - Density: 4.286/km^{2} (11.10/sq mi)
- Time zone: UTC+10:00 (AEST)
- Postcode: 4611
Localities around Mondure
Marshlands	Marshlands	Silverleaf
Kawl Kawl	Mondure	Silverleaf
Keysland	Leafdale	Silverleaf

Mondure is a rural town and locality in the South Burnett Region, Queensland, Australia. In the 2021 census, the locality of Mondure had a population of 102 people.

== History ==
The town takes its name from the Mondrure pastoral run taken up in 1844 by Richard Jones, which used a Waka language word, mondhur meaning small ant.

Land was open for selection on 17 April 1877; 68 square miles (180 km^{2}) were available in Mondure and 56 square miles (150 km^{2}) in Mondure back run.

Circa 1900s, 78 farming blocks in the Mondure Estate were advertised to be sold. The map advertisement states that the blocks were 6 miles from Wondai railway station and 4 miles from Murgon railway station.

Mondure North Provisional School opened in January 1905. On 1 Jan 1909, it became Mondure North State School. It closed in October 1922.

On Saturday 11 March 1911, 120 town lots were auctioned in the Township of Mondure.

On Sunday 19 May 1912, St Johann's Lutheran Church (also known as St John's) was officially opened by Pastor Otto Thiele in the presence of 250 people. It was 30 by 24 feet (9.1 by 7.3 m), made of hardwood, and cost £140. In 1964, it was relocated to become the church hall for St John-Trinity Lutheran Church in Wondai.

Redeemer Lutheran Church was built from timber in 1916. It was extended in 1941. It was subsequently closed and converted into a house. It is at 411 Mondure Marshlands Rd (26.180463°S 151.7739°E).

On 23 February 1917, the Queensland Railways Department decided to call the town's railway station Kooblinga but this was changed on 11 January 1918 to be Mondure at the request of the Mondure Branch of the Queensland Farmers Union.

St Faith's Anglican Church was dedicated on Monday 12 October 1912 by Archbishop of Brisbane St Clair Donaldson. It was a timber church which could seat 100 people. It was built from timber. The church held its final service on 21 May 2023. The church and its cemetery were offered as a gift to the South Burnett Regional Council, but it was declined due to concerns about the ongoing maintenance costs. It was in Marjorie Lane (26.1800°S 151.7709°E).

A Methodist Church, later Uniting Church was removed to Mondure from Leafdale and functioned for approximately 60 years before being sold to become a private residence.

Mondure Township State School opened on 24 January 1921. In 1938 it was renamed Mondure State School. It closed on 31 December 1998. It was at 741 Kawl Kawl Road (26.1809°S 151.7692°E). It was converted into a private residence.

In June 1928, Mondure had a butcher shop, general store (Mondure Stores Company), post office and telephone exchange, Refreshments room, Railway Station and associated depots and a large sale yards belonging to Bacon & Co. Kingaroy.

== Demographics ==
In the 2016 census, the locality of Mondure had a population of 100 people.

In the 2021 census, the locality of Mondure had a population of 102 people.

== Education ==
There are no schools in Mondure. The nearest government primary school (Prep-6) is Wheatlands State School in Wheatlands to the east. The nearest government secondary schools are Wondai State School (to Year 9) in Wondai to the south, Proston State School (to Year 10) in Proston to the west, and Murgon State High School (to Year 12) in Murgon to the south-east.

== Amenities ==
St Faith's Anglican Church is at 741 Kawl Kawl Road (26.1809°S 151.7691°E).
