= Wooroonden =

- Suburb
- Wooroonden State School building as seen from Bradleys Road in 2015.

- Interactive map of Wooroonden
- Coordinates: 26.1130°S 151.7597°E
- Country: Australia
- State: Queensland
- LGA: South Burnett Region
- Location: 24.6 km (15.3 mi) NW of Murgon; 63.3 km (39.3 mi) N of Kingaroy; 116 km (72 mi) W of Gympie; 282 km (175 mi) NNW of Brisbane

Government
  - State electorate: Nanango
  - Federal division: Wide Bay

Area
  - Total: 29.9 km^{2} (11.5 sq mi)

Population
  - Total: 54 (2021 census)
  - Density: 1.806/km^{2} (4.68/sq mi)
- Time zone: UTC+10:00 (AEST)
- Postcode: 4605
Suburbs around Wooroonden
Stonelands	Glenrock	Glenrock
Stonelands	Wooroonden	Glenrock
Marshlands	Silverleaf	Cloyna

Wooroonden is a rural locality in the South Burnett Region, Queensland, Australia. In the 2021 census, Wooroonden had a population of 54 people.

== History ==
Wooroonden State School building, 2011

Wooroon State School opened on 14 October 1918. In 1919, the spelling was changed to Woroon State School. In 1925, it was renamed Woroonden State School. It closed in 1963. It was on the north-western corner of Webbers Bridge Road and Bradleys Road (26.11912°S 151.75704°E). As at 2011, the school building was still extant and the site has been renamed Hughie Campbell Memorial Park.

The district was originally known as Woroonden but on advice from the Murgon Shire Council on 24 January 2002, the locality name spelling was officially made Wooroonden.

== Demographics ==
In the 2016 census, Wooroonden had a population of 59 people, 36% female and 64% male. The median age of the population was 40 years, 2 years above the national median of 38.

In the 2021 census, Wooroonden had a population of 54 people, 37% female and 63% male. The median age of the population was 45 years, 7 years above the national median of 38.

== Education ==
There are no schools in Wooroonden. The nearest government primary school is Cloyna State School in neighbouring Cloyna to the east. The nearest government secondary schools are Proston State School (to Year 10) in Proston to the south-west and Murgon State High School (to Year 12) in Murgon to the south-east. There is also a Catholic primary school in Murgon.
