= Windera railway line =

Former railway line in Queensland, Australia

Overview
- Locale: Queensland, Australia
- Termini: Barlil; Windera
- Stations: 5

History
- Opened: 28 March 1925
- Closed: 1 July 1961

Technical
- Track gauge: 3 ft 6 in (1,067 mm)

The Windera Branch Railway was a branch railway line from Barlil to Windera in Queensland, Australia.

== History ==
Contemporaneously with parliamentary approval for the Murgon-to-Proston railway line came authorisation for a branch line from Barlil, the first station on the Proston line, 20 kilometres (12 mi) north to Windera in south-east Queensland, Australia.

On Saturday 28 March 1925, the 12-mile (19 km) railway line from Barlil to Windera was officially opened by Alfred James Jones, the Minister for Mines and formerly the Member of the Queensland Legislative Assembly for Burnett. The line passed through sidings at Warnung, Cloyna, and Kitoba. Despite handling regular pig and cream traffic plus occasional livestock, its existence was never really justified. The uneconomic branch closed from 1 July 1961.
