= Murgon State School =

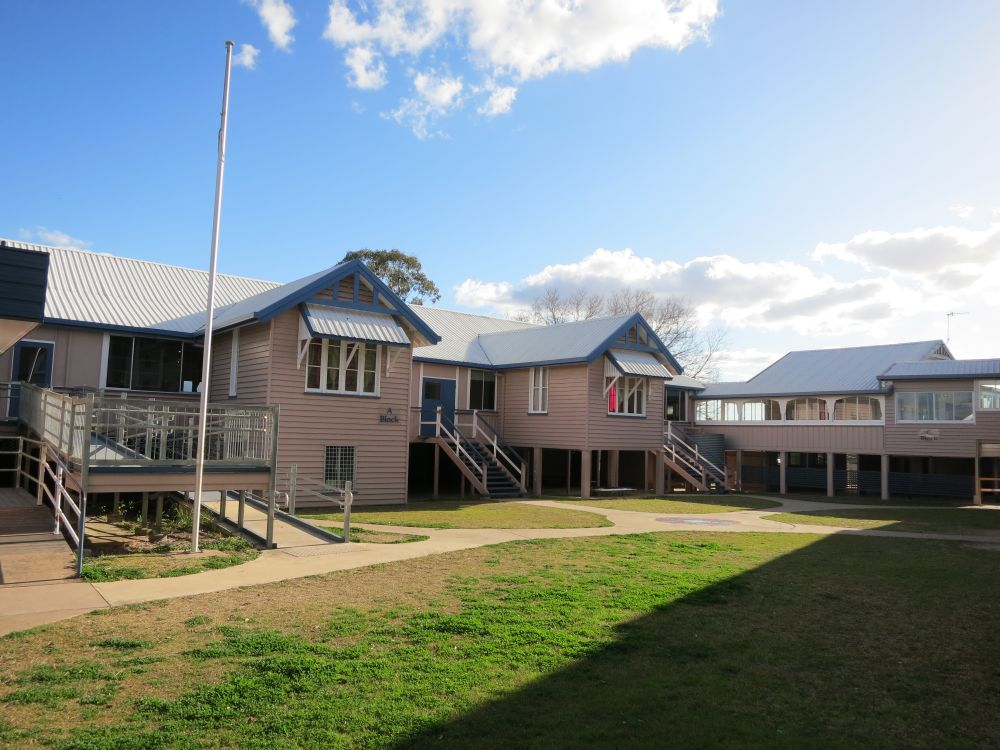
- Blocks A and C, looking west, 2015

- Location within Queensland
- 26.2394°S 151.9428°E
- Location: 91 Gore Street, Murgon, South Burnett Region, Queensland, Australia

History
- Design period: 1914–1919 (World War I)
- Built: 1914–1940

Site notes
- Architect: Department of Public Works (Queensland)

Queensland Heritage Register
- Official name: Murgon State School; Murgon Rural School
- Type: state heritage
- Designated: 9 October 2015
- Reference no.: 650003
- Type: Education, Research, Scientific Facility: Accommodation – teacher's residence; Education, research, scientific facility: Pre-school; Education, research, scientific facility: School-state
- Theme: Maintaining order: Policing and maintaining law and order; Educating Queenslanders: Providing primary schooling

Murgon State School is a heritage-listed state school, pre-school and teacher's residence at 91 Gore Street, Murgon, South Burnett Region, Queensland, Australia. It was designed by Department of Public Works (Queensland) and built from 1914 to 1940. It was also known as Murgon Provisional School and Murgon Rural School. It was added to the Queensland Heritage Register on 9 October 2015.

== History ==
Murgon State School opened in 1908 as Murgon Provisional School (changing to Murgon State School in 1909) within the small agricultural settlement of Murgon, to serve its growing rural population. A new teaching building replaced the original provisional school building in 1917 and shortly afterwards, in 1925, the school began operating as a rural school. By the mid-1930s the school complex had grown to include a range of vocational teaching buildings, including a blacksmith's shop (1930, extended 1935–36) and domestic science building (1935–36). Due to the loss of the southern portion of the original school reserve in 1915 for the construction of the Murgon-Proston railway line, school expansion occurred to the north between 1959 and 1972, resuming part of Fryar Street and acquiring the former Murgon Court House (1940) for educational purposes. The school has been in continuous operation since establishment and has been a focus for the local community as a place for important social and cultural activity.

The first European settlers arrived in the Murgon area, the traditional land of the Wakka Wakka people, in the 1840s, taking up land which is now known as Barambah Homestead. In 1901 part of Barambah pastoral station became the Barambah Mission Station - known as Cherbourg from 1932. The nearby town of Murgon, about 6 kilometres (3.7 mi) to the north, grew around the location of an unattended timber loading siding, which opened in 1903 on the Nanango railway line from Kilkivan to Kingaroy. The railway, which facilitated the transport of local produce - maize and pumpkins, pigs, cattle and dairy products - to markets, spurred an influx of selectors who took up land excised from Barambah Station in 1902 and again in 1913. Murgon was surveyed and the sale of town lots took place in 1906. Murgon's development was stimulated by the creation of the Shire of Murgon in 1914, with Murgon as its administrative centre; and the construction of a railway line from Murgon to Proston (commenced 1916, completed 1923), with a branch line to Windera (1925).

The early basis for the prosperity of Murgon was the dairy industry. During the interwar period dairying expanded greatly in Queensland, and by the 1930s it was the state's most widely spread agricultural industry. While butter factories enabled the production and export of dairy products, numerous small farms, reliant on family labour to milk herds twice daily for generally modest returns, were the backbone of the industry.

Cream from Murgon's dairy farmers was initially railed to the Tiaro butter factory, which relocated to Murgon in 1913. Murgon's butter factory (the South Burnett Co-operative Dairy Association Factory) was extended in the late 1920s, and by 1931 it was Queensland's fourth largest butter producer. By the mid- to late-1930s Murgon was rapidly expanding as a service centre for its surrounding agricultural community, and a new and impressive Art-Deco style Murgon Civic Centre was built in 1938. In 1911 Murgon's population had been 706; however by 1941 it was the second largest centre (after Kingaroy) in the South Burnett, with a population of 1091.

The establishment of schools was considered an essential step in the development of early communities and integral to their success. Locals often donated land and labour for a school's construction and the school community contributed to maintenance and development. Schools became a community focus, a symbol of progress, and a source of pride, with enduring connections formed with past pupils, parents, and teachers.

Steps towards the establishment of a school in Murgon began in 1906. In September of that year George Arnell, president of the Murgon Progress Association, wrote to the Minister for Education about opening a school in Murgon. A building committee was later formed and a site for the school reserve was selected on the north side of town. The reserve of 10 acres (4.0 ha), bounded by Gore, Fryar, Bell (now Krebs) and Stephens streets, was proclaimed in August 1907. Contractors McKewan and Woods were the successful tenderers for the erection of the school at Murgon, and it was completed in November 1907. Located in the southern quarter of the school reserve, the school building comprised a single classroom with verandahs front and back.

The school opened as Murgon Provisional School on 24 February 1908 with an enrolment of 40 pupils, increasing

to 67 pupils by the end of March. Provisional schools, which could be opened with as few as 15 (later 12) pupils, were regarded as interim measures until state schools were built. If the district or town developed, provisional schools were raised to state school status, with larger, purpose-designed school buildings and teacher residences constructed, attracting better qualified and more experienced teachers. Murgon Provisional School became a State School in 1909, only a year after opening. Over time the building was enlarged and raised, with space underneath used for classes and later partially enclosed.

In 1914 a teacher's residence was added to the site, fulfilling "a long felt need" Most Queensland state schools incorporated a teacher's residence on the site, particularly in rural areas. In Australia, only Queensland offered free accommodation to teachers, the government policy applying to male teachers (only) from as early as 1864. This was partial recompense for a low wage, an incentive for teacher recruitment in rural areas and provided onsite caretakers. From the 1880s they were built as detached residences and were similar to the vernacular Queensland house. Designed by the Department of Public Works and constructed to the high standard demanded by the state, teacher's residences were typically of a higher-quality than most similarly scaled private residences. The residence was located within the school grounds at a distance from the teaching buildings, usually with a separate, fenced yard. Residence designs varied in size and evolved to keep up with modern needs and styles.

In May 1914, W Bytheway was announced as the successful tenderer for the construction of the teacher's residence at Murgon State School, for a cost of £686. A standard Department of Public Works design, the residence was timber-framed and -clad with a hipped roof. The layout comprised: a front verandah with central staircase; a four-room core containing a sitting room, dining room and two bedrooms; an internal semi-enclosed dining verandah (running the full width of the residence); and a rear wing containing a kitchen, pantry, bathroom and servants bedroom. The residence was located northeast of the teaching building, facing Gore Street.

The following year, confirmation that the route of the proposed Murgon-to-Proston railway line would pass diagonally through the centre of the School Reserve meant that major changes were needed at the school. The newly completed teacher's residence could remain in place; however the teaching building was now partly overlapped by the railway reserve. A new School Reserve was surveyed in 1915 and assented to by the Department of Education. Now triangular in shape, it occupied the north-eastern half of the block, on the corner of Gore and Fryar streets, with the main entrance from Fryar Street. Construction of the railway line began in 1916.

Prior to the removal of the original teaching building, a new State School building of a standard government design was constructed in 1917 within the new school reserve. To help ensure consistency and economy, the Queensland Government developed standard plans for its school buildings. From the 1860s until the 1960s, Queensland school buildings were predominantly timber-framed, an easy and cost-effective approach that also enabled the government to provide facilities in remote areas. Standard designs were continually refined in response to changing needs and educational philosophy and Queensland school buildings were particularly innovative in their response to climate control, lighting, and ventilation. Standardisation produced distinctly similar schools across Queensland with complexes of typical components.

From 1893 the Department of Public Works greatly improved the natural ventilation and lighting of classroom interiors, experimenting with different combinations of roof ventilators, ceiling and wall vents, larger windows, dormer windows and ducting. High-set buildings, introduced c. 1909, provided better ventilation as well as further teaching space and a covered play area underneath. This was a noticeable new direction and this form became a characteristic of Queensland schools. A technical innovation developed at this time was a continuous ventilation flap on the wall at floor level. This hinged board could be opened to increase air flow into the space and, combined with a ceiling vent and large roof fleche, improved internal air quality and decreased internal temperatures.

Achieving an adequate level of natural light in classrooms, without glare, became central to the design and layout of all school buildings. From around 1909 windows were arranged to provide gentle, southern light into the room and desks positioned so that the light would fall onto students' left hand sides to avoid throwing shadows onto the pages; this presupposed that all students were right-handed. In 1914 the suburban school type was introduced, combining these new features and providing an ideal, modern education environment.

The new Murgon State School building (now Block A) was a standard suburban school type. A highset timber building with a gable roof, it comprised: three classrooms divided by glazed, folding partitions; a northern verandah with hat room enclosures at each end; and an attached teacher's room. The arrangement of windows and desks ensured that left-hand light entered the classrooms, with large banks of casements in the end walls and in the centre of the southwest wall. The interior walls were lined with v-jointed (VJ), tongue-and-groove (T&G) timber boards and the ceiling with pressed metal. Classrooms were vented by a continuous hinged ventilation board at floor level and ceiling vents which linked to a prominent roof fleche. A concrete play area was provided beneath the school with lavatories battened off under the hat rooms.

Constructed by day labour for an estimated cost of £1560, the building was opened on 18 October 1917. It was located northeast of the teacher's residence, facing Fryar Street.

Less than two years after opening, in May 1919, the school was closed temporarily due to a local outbreak of the worldwide influenza pandemic. The school building was converted for use as an isolation hospital and a kitchen erected, at a cost of £30. In early June there were over 17 patients at the hospital, with the doctor also affected. By the end of June the epidemic was abating.

Murgon continued to prosper in the 1920s, with dairying and pig rearing the mainstays of the district. In August 1923 the chairman of Murgon Shire Council met with the Minister for Education and asked that a rural school be erected at Murgon. The Minister responded that if the district raised sufficient money a rural school would be built. A committee of shire councillors was formed to raise the necessary funds.

Despite the importance of the rural sector in the Queensland economy, rural education and training was slow to develop, with no significant action taken until the 1890s. In 1897 the Queensland Agricultural College was established at Lawes near Gatton, providing agricultural and related scientific training for young men. Under the control of the Department of Agriculture and Stock, the college was part of a wider scheme of introducing "scientific agriculture" to the colony that also included experimental farms and travelling model dairies.

Within the school system, a limited form of rural instruction was introduced in syllabus changes made in 1905 and 1915. However, the success of "nature studies" in state schools was dependent on the enthusiasm of individual teachers. A new approach, utilising central agricultural primary schools, staffed with trained experts and drawing students from nearby state schools, was envisaged. The purpose of rural schools was to educate children to enable them to develop rural areas and to provide a means of extending country children's education beyond the compulsory years with an additional year of agricultural and domestic studies.

John Douglas Story, Under Secretary of Public Instruction from 1906, believed that Queensland's future depended on agricultural development, and between 1914 and 1916 he finalised a plan for three tiers of agricultural education - rural schools, state high schools, and an Agricultural Department at the University of Queensland. In 1910 Story appointed James Clement Stubbin to provide expert guidance as Queensland's Teacher of Agriculture. Stubbin promoted the notion of a scientific approach to agriculture by writing a textbook on the school garden, agricultural bulletins, and constantly touring schools to personally give lessons on topics such as milk and cream testing, planting and pruning.

The first rural school was established as an adjunct to Nambour State School in 1917. The success of this venture prompted the expansion of rural schools and courses in Queensland. Altogether 30 rural schools opened in Queensland between 1917 and 1939, with three, including Murgon, opening in 1925. Each was located in prime fruit-growing, dairying or agricultural areas and functioned "as a central school for the surrounding district schools, teaching domestic, commercial, agricultural and vocational classes".

Vocational training subjects required a variety of purpose-built facilities and were initially gender segregated - for example, woodwork, metalwork and leather work classes for boys, cooking, sewing and laundry classes for girls. Many rural schools were opened in sectional school buildings, however it was not always possible to construct new vocational buildings, with some schools altering or converting existing buildings. Standard, purpose-designed vocational buildings were first introduced in 1928. In 1936 the Minister for Education permitted students to take vocational subjects in lieu of geography or history in the Junior Examination, increasing the subjects' popularity.

The Murgon community raised the necessary funds for a rural school by January 1924. In order to accommodate the rural school classes, the understorey of the 1917 teaching building was enclosed and divided into three spaces. The external walls were clad in weatherboards, with casement windows providing light and ventilation. Domestic Science was taught in the southeast room, and had a stove alcove and a sink installed along the southeast wall. The remaining two rooms were dedicated to leather and wood work and sheet metal work. Murgon Rural School was officially opened by Undersecretary McKenna on 30 March 1925, and began operating, with 160 pupils, from 1 April.

The new rural school was praised as an immediate success. The school was well equipped by the Department of Education with tools and materials, and pupils were charged a few pence each week to attend. The boys produced useful articles from scrap, while the girls provided a well cooked meal every day, which pupils could buy at lunchtime. As the rural school operated in conjunction with the state school, overcrowding soon resulted. Transport was often an issue for those pupils who travelled to Murgon from other state schools, as train timetables did not necessarily match the days their classes were scheduled. Various attempts between 1925 and 1929 to provide a bus service for children to attend Murgon - from Boat Mountain, Windera, Merlwood and Cloyna - did not last, and for the more remote schools branches of Murgon rural school were set up and staff were sent out to teach vocational and domestic science classes; including at Kingaroy from 1926, and Kilkivan from 1927.

In 1927 a playshed was constructed in the school grounds, fulfilling a "long-felt want". The Queensland education system recognised the importance of play in the school curriculum and the provision of all-weather outdoor space was needed. Playsheds were designed as free-standing shelters that provided covered play space and doubled as teaching space when required. Built to a standard design and ranging in size relative to student numbers, these structures were timber-framed and generally open sided, although some were partially enclosed with timber boards or corrugated galvanised iron sheets. The usually hipped roofs were clad with timber shingles or corrugated iron. Playsheds were a typical school addition between c. 1880s and the 1950s, although less frequently constructed after c. 1909, with the introduction of highset school buildings with understorey play areas.

Fundraising for the playshed had been undertaken by the Murgon School Committee, who sent away for copies of plans in 1926. It was constructed by contractor J. Krebs, and an official opening was held during Arbor Day celebrations on 5 August 1927.

An important component of Queensland state schools was their grounds. The early and continuing commitment to play-based education resulted in the provision of outdoor play space and sporting facilities, such as ovals and tennis courts. Arbor Day celebrations began in Queensland in 1890, and trees and gardens were regularly planted to shade and beautify schools. Aesthetically designed gardens were encouraged by regional inspectors, and educators believed gardening and Arbor Days instilled in young minds the value of hard work and activity, improved classroom discipline, developed aesthetic tastes, and inspired people to stay on the land.

Arbor Day celebrations in the early years of Murgon State School included activities such as tree planting, gardening lessons, picnics and games. The school grounds were greatly improved in the early 1920s. By 1924, 12 large experimental vegetable plots, covering about a quarter of an acre, had been laid out, with flowers planted around the edges and rose beds in the centre. An experimental plot of cotton plants had also been established, as well as seed bed boxes for vegetables. A school tennis court, "one of the best in Murgon", had also been constructed by this time. At some point prior to the 1940s several pepperina trees (Schinus molle) were planted in the northern school grounds, two of which survive.

By April 1929 the inconvenience of holding the rural classes beneath the main teaching building, where the noise from tin-smithing and carpentry was a distraction to children studying above, prompted calls for new facilities to be constructed. The Department of Education promised that the matter would be speedily remedied, and in October 1930 two new buildings were opened - a blacksmith's shop and a manual training building.

Designed by the Department of Public Works, the blacksmith's shop was a rectangular, timber-framed shed 21 by 10 feet (6.4 m × 3.0 m), with a skillion roof and earth floor. Access was through two large double doors on the southern side, while the remaining walls were clad in corrugated metal sheeting. The manual training building was a standard government design. It was lowset, timber-framed and -clad with a front verandah and gambrel roof, containing a large room for woodwork and a smaller room for sheet metal work. The manual training building was located at the corner of Gore and Fryer streets but the original location of the blacksmith's shop is unclear. At the opening ceremony, the Minister for Education, Reginald King, said that the school was extremely lucky that the work was done, as financial difficulties within the department meant that no more work of this class would be undertaken for some time.

Further additions to cope with growing student numbers were needed, however, particularly as classes still held beneath the main teaching building were "most uncomfortable" due to the concrete floor and insufficient natural daylighting. In 1935–36 a major building program was undertaken, which included the extension of the 1917 teaching building (Block A), the construction of an additional teaching building (part of Block C) and a domestic science building, and the relocation and extension of the blacksmith's shop. Construction began in mid-1935, with the work being carried out by day labour under the supervision of the Department of Public Works.

Additions to Block A included two extra classrooms at the northwest end, additional verandahs to all but the southwest side, and a second teacher's room. As part of the process of remodelling the building, banks of windows in the 1917 building were removed from the end walls and installed along the southwest wall, so that all classrooms now had southern light. This modification brought the building closer in form to the popular sectional school type. Other alterations included relocating the hat rooms on the verandahs and removing the stove alcove from the former domestic science room beneath.

The sectional school type was introduced to Queensland schools in the 1920s. This fundamentally new design combined all the best features of previous types and implemented theories of an ideal education environment. Practical and economical, it proved very successful and was used unaltered until 1950. Its most important features were that it allowed for the orderly expansion of schools over time (due to removable end walls), and that its strict east–west orientation, with large areas of glazing along the southern wall, provided maximum natural light from the south. Before the sectional school, solar orientation was not given prominence and all school buildings were oriented in relation to the street and property boundaries.

The additional teaching building (now part of Block C) comprised a single classroom with verandahs on the southeast and northwest sides and windows in the end walls. A small school building, this type of building was constructed between 1930 and 1946 and was a continuation of earlier types of country schools. Unlike sectional schools, they were not designed for expansion. The building was linked to the northwest end of Block A by an extension of its south-eastern verandah, which featured decorative timber brackets.

The domestic science building, like the manual training building, was a standard vocational building type. It was a lowset timber building with a gambrel roof and a northern verandah. Internally it comprised two rooms - a large room with two stove recesses projecting from the northwest wall, used for dressmaking and cookery, and a narrow room along the southwest side used as a laundry and ironing room. The building was located along the Fryer Street boundary, northwest of the manual training building. In 1937 the verandah was enclosed and a corner cupboard constructed.

The extension of the blacksmith's shop doubled the length of the structure and replicated the framing and materials of the 1930 section, including double doors along the southwest side. Its new location was between the playshed and the domestic science building, along the Fryar Street boundary.

The new buildings, which cost a total of £2500, were officially opened by the Minister for Education, Frank Cooper, on 21 February 1936. As part of the celebrations afternoon tea was served by the domestic science teacher and pupils. Mr Cooper was presented with a leather pocket wallet produced by the rural schoolboys, and Mrs Cooper with a "beautifully iced cake" from the domestic science class.

On the opposite side of Fryar Street, a new Court House was completed in 1940. The court house was built to replace a 1914 combined court house and police station, which stood to the east of the new court house until being removed in the mid-1970s. The 1940 court house, like most early timber court houses in Queensland, was built in a T shape, with a single courtroom as the base of the T, and offices arranged along the crossbar. From 1912, court house design included gabled and hipped roofs over the courtroom and offices. Unlike the similar Nanango Court House (1936), Murgon's courtroom was at the rear, and the portico entrance led to a veranda running along the office wing. The Murgon Court House had six offices, including offices for a veterinary surgeon, dairy inspector, Police Magistrate, Court of Petty Sessions, and a general office.

Between the 1940s and 1960s the rural school scheme was phased out due to a move to larger farms by the late 1940s and the consequent decline in government emphasis on closer settlement, and the transfer of domestic, vocational and commercial subjects to the curriculum of the growing number of state high schools. Murgon State School ceased to be a rural school in 1959, coinciding with the opening of Murgon High School.

Dairying declined as a major industry in Queensland after World War II. Butter consumption per capita in Australia dropped from 12.2 kilograms (27 lb) to 8.3 kilograms (18 lb) between 1957 and 1972 as margarine increased its market share. The transition towards the production of milk rather than cream, requiring larger herds and new equipment, saw many smaller scale farmers leaving the industry. Export opportunities also became restricted, culminating with the end of preferential trade agreements with Britain following its entry into the European Common Market in 1973. The late 1960s saw the beginning of closures of butter factories in the Burnett region, and with the closure of the Nanango and Kingaroy butter factories in 1977, all cream supplies were diverted to Murgon factory, the last remaining dairy factory in the South Burnett until its closure in 1995. However, although local dairy farming declined, beef and pork production continued. The South Burnett Meat Works operated just outside Murgon between 1962 and 2007.

The decline in Queensland dairying also coincided with the closure of most of the small state schools in a 10–15 kilometres (6.2–9.3 mi) radius around Murgon, between the 1940s to the 1970s, including a burst of closures in the 1960s. Conversely, the school buildings at Murgon were extended during the 1950s and 1960s, as remaining students from the closed schools travelled to Murgon, aided by a school bus service (referred to as the 'Monkey Bus').

After the closure of the rural school the vocational buildings continued to be used and adapted for other purposes. In 1959 the domestic science building was converted into a library. At some point the stove alcoves in the northwest wall were removed and large banks of awning windows installed in the northwest and southwest walls.

Also in 1959, the manual training building was moved, raised, and its structure incorporated into a new linear block of classrooms (now Block B). During this process it was extensively altered, with all original linings and joinery removed. Linked by a high level walkway to Block C and extending in an easterly direction, Block B forms a courtyard area with Block A.

Block C, which originated with the 1936 single classroom linked to the western end of Block A, was extended to the west in stages between 1966 and 1969. In the process, features such as the northwest verandah and windows in the northeast wall were removed.

The south-eastern verandah of Block A (constructed in 1936) was enclosed in 1960 to form a staff room. In 1973 this verandah was removed for the construction of a new brick administration building adjoining Block A. Toilets beneath the verandah were removed and a staircase installed in the northeast corner of the 1917 verandah. In 1981 Block A was upgraded, which involved the partial removal of internal partitions and the insertion of two store rooms in the central classroom. The northern verandah was enclosed and most windows in the verandah wall removed.

In the early 1970s the school reserve was expanded to approximately 3.8 hectares (9.4 acres). Fryar Street was closed in two stages - the western end in 1959 and the remainder in 1972, when the whole school reserve was resurveyed to include most of the land north to Dutton Street. The new grounds were landscaped to create a playing field and tennis courts.

A new court house was built elsewhere in Murgon in 1967, and the 1940 Court House building on the north side of the former Fryar Street was included within the expanded school reserve. The building was used as an Opportunity School until it was renovated to become a preschool in 1981. It remains in its original location and in 2015 houses many school and community functions, including a play group.

Today, Murgon continues to be a service centre for the surrounding area, with a population of 2496 in 2011. Murgon State School celebrated its centenary in 2008, and commemorated the event by publishing a revised school history book. Recent additions to the school grounds include the construction of ramps to improve accessibility. The school is important to the area, having been a focus for the community, and generations of Murgon students have been taught there. Since establishment it has been a key social focus for the Murgon community with the grounds and building having been the location of many social events.

== Description ==
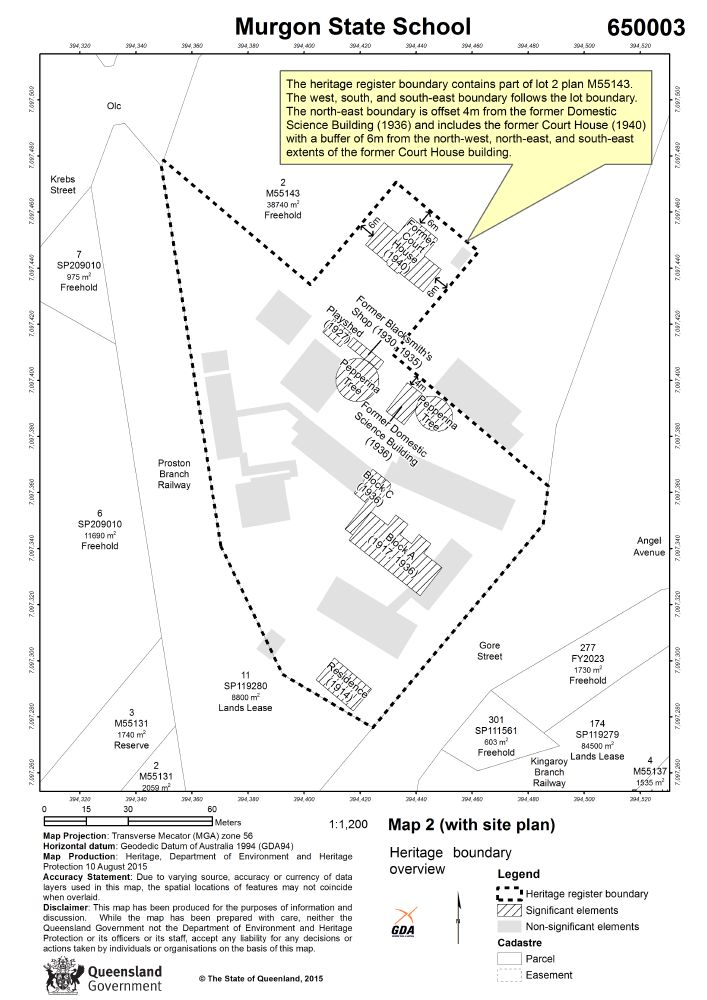
Site map, 2015

Murgon State School is located on the northern side of the small town of Murgon in the South Burnett region. The gently sloping, 3.8 hectares (9.4 acres) site is bounded by a railway reserve to the west, Gore Street to the southeast, Dutton Street to the northeast and Krebs Street to the northwest. A former road reserve (now part of the school grounds) runs through the centre of the site, with most school buildings located within the triangular-shaped area to its south. The teacher's residence is located in the far southern corner of this area; Blocks A and C in the centre; and the former domestic science building, former blacksmith's shop and Playshed along the northern edge. The former Court House is located on the north side of the former road reserve. The remainder of the northern school grounds contain playing fields and are not included within the heritage boundary. The school is accessed by several entrances from Gore Street and a secondary entrance from Krebs Street.

All of the significant buildings are timber-framed with roofs clad in metal sheeting. With the exception of the playshed and former blacksmith's shop, all buildings have been re-stumped, so that they now stand upon a combination of square concrete piers and round metal posts.

=== Teacher's residence (1914) ===
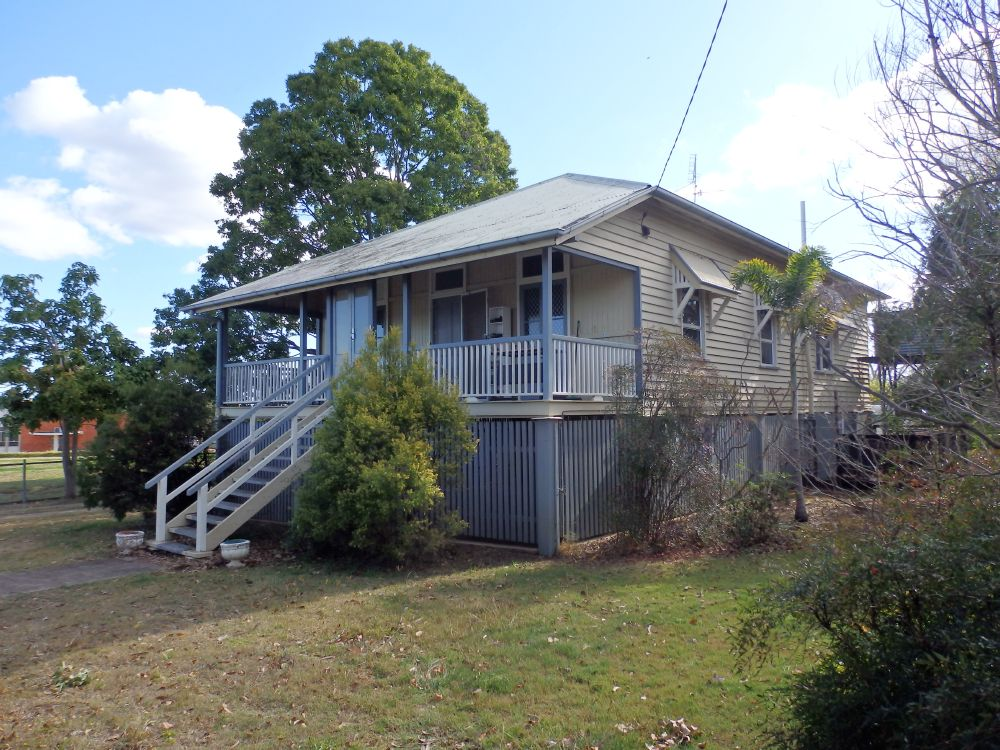
Teacher's residence, 2015

The teacher's residence occupies a wedge-shaped yard and faces southeast to address Gore Street. It is highset, clad in weatherboards, with a front verandah and a hipped roof. It contains: a four-room core of three bedrooms and a living room, connected by a short hallway; a former dining verandah (now enclosed); and a rear wing containing a kitchen, bathroom and former servants bedroom. The understorey is enclosed by timber batten screens and has a laundry room enclosure at the northwest end.

The eaves have exposed rafters and are lined with v-jointed (VJ) tongue and groove (T&G) boards. A side staircase and landing are later additions and not of heritage significance. All windows are modern replacements; however skillion-roofed timber window hoods are retained on the southwest and northeast sides.

The front verandah has a timber floor, a single-skin verandah wall, a two-rail balustrade with vertical rail infill, and a raked ceiling lined with VJ boards. It is accessed by a set of centrally located timber steps. Two sets of half-glazed French doors opening on to the verandah have had the door leafs replaced, however they retain their early framing and two-light fanlights above. The main entrance has a low-waisted, four panel timber door with original hardware and a single-light fanlight above.

The internal layout has remained largely unchanged, apart from the enclosure of a doorway between the dining verandah and the northwest bedroom; the addition of a toilet and cupboards to the northern end of the dining verandah; and the demolition of the former pantry to create a larger bathroom. The kitchen retains its projecting stove alcove in the western corner.

Walls and ceilings are lined with VJ, T&G boards, and round ceiling vents with decorative grilles are located in the centre of each room. Internal partitions are single skin and have belt rails with beaded edges. The rooms retain original joinery, including modest skirtings, cornices and architraves. Internal doors are generally four-panel timber doors with rectangular, horizontally-centre pivoting fanlights. A low-waisted, half-glazed French door connects the dining verandah and the living room, and doors to the former servant's room and the toilet are braced and ledged board doors. All early doors have original door hardware.

=== Block A (1917, extended 1935–1936) ===
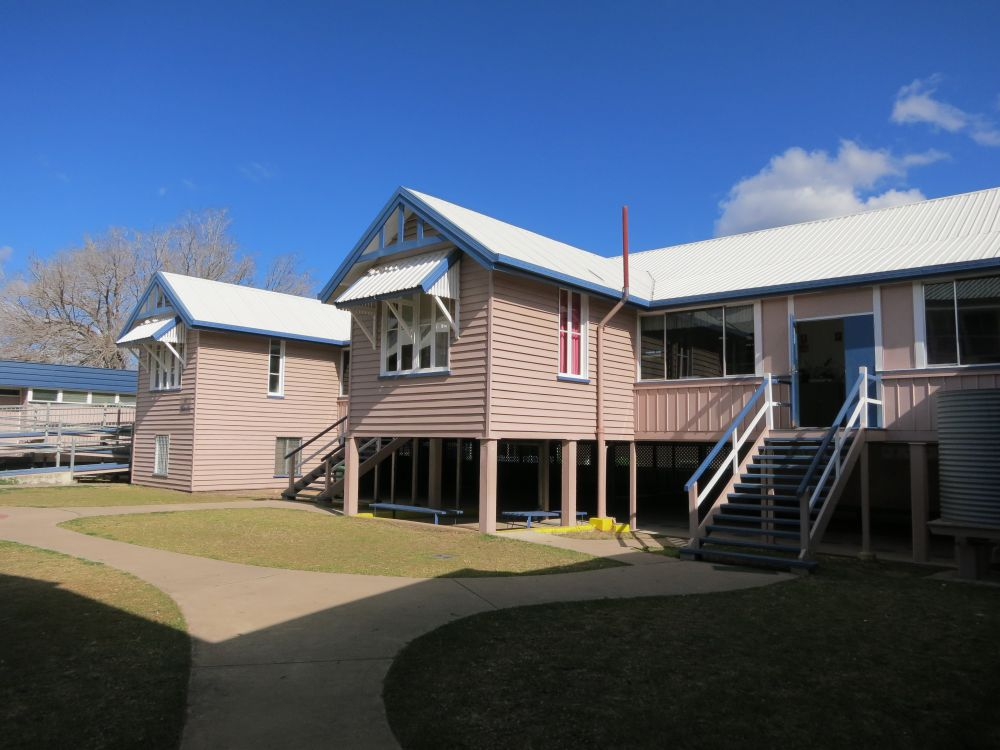
Block A, from north-east, 2015

Block A is a long, rectangular building, clad in weatherboards, with enclosed verandahs on the northeast and northwest sides and two projecting teacher's rooms. The building was constructed in two phases – the southern end in 1917, and the northern end in 1935–1936 – with some differences in joinery and interior detailing.

The gable roof has raked eaves lined with VJ, T&G boards. Gable end walls to the main building and teachers rooms have vertical batten gable infill and packed weatherboards at the gable peak. Two sets of timber stairs access the northwest verandah. A third staircase (c.1972, not significant) is located within the verandah space at the southeast end, linking Block A to the adjacent Administration building.

Early joinery includes five large banks of windows in the southwest wall; casement windows to the teachers rooms; and two surviving sets of casement windows in the northeast verandah wall. Windows from the 1917 building are generally single-pane casements or vertically centre-pivoting windows with two-light fanlights above, while windows from the 1936 additions are tall, two-light casements with three-light fanlights. The 1917 teachers room has tall, three-light casements. Timber-framed, skillion-roofed window hoods shield the northeast-facing windows of the teachers rooms.

The enclosed northeast verandah has a single skin verandah wall and a raked ceiling lined with VJ, T&G boards. Ventilation boards run along the base of the 1917 section of the verandah wall, and sections of bag hooks survive in places. The balustrade has been replaced by bag racks or modern kitchen cabinets. All doors have been removed from the verandah wall, however the openings remain with tall, two-light, horizontally-centre pivoting fanlights above. Additional doorways have been created in the location of former windows.

The enclosed northwest verandah has been turned into a store room. The southwest corner contains fabric from a 1917 hat room which was relocated there during the 1936 extension.

The teachers rooms are the same size and have similar design features and ornamentation. Both are accessed by a single door from the northeast verandah. The 1917 room is clad in weatherboards on the verandah-facing side, while the same wall on the 1936 room is single skin. Internally, both are clad in VJ, T&G boards on the walls and on the ceiling of the 1936 room. The 1917 room has a pressed metal ceiling.

Originally containing five classrooms, a portion of the central classroom has been turned into store rooms by modern partitions. The boarded bulkheads of the original classroom partitions survive, with modern partitions and folding doors installed beneath. The 1917 classrooms have pressed metal-clad hipped ceilings with centrally located, square ventilation panels. The 1936 classrooms have VJ board-lined coved ceilings with metal tie rods and square lattice ventilation panels. All classrooms have VJ board-lined walls.

The understory has a concrete slab floor and is partially enclosed, with: weatherboard-clad walls along the southwest side; a weatherboard-clad room beneath the 1917 teachers room; and a former toilet block at the northwest end (now a storage area).

=== Block C, southeast classroom (1935–1936) ===
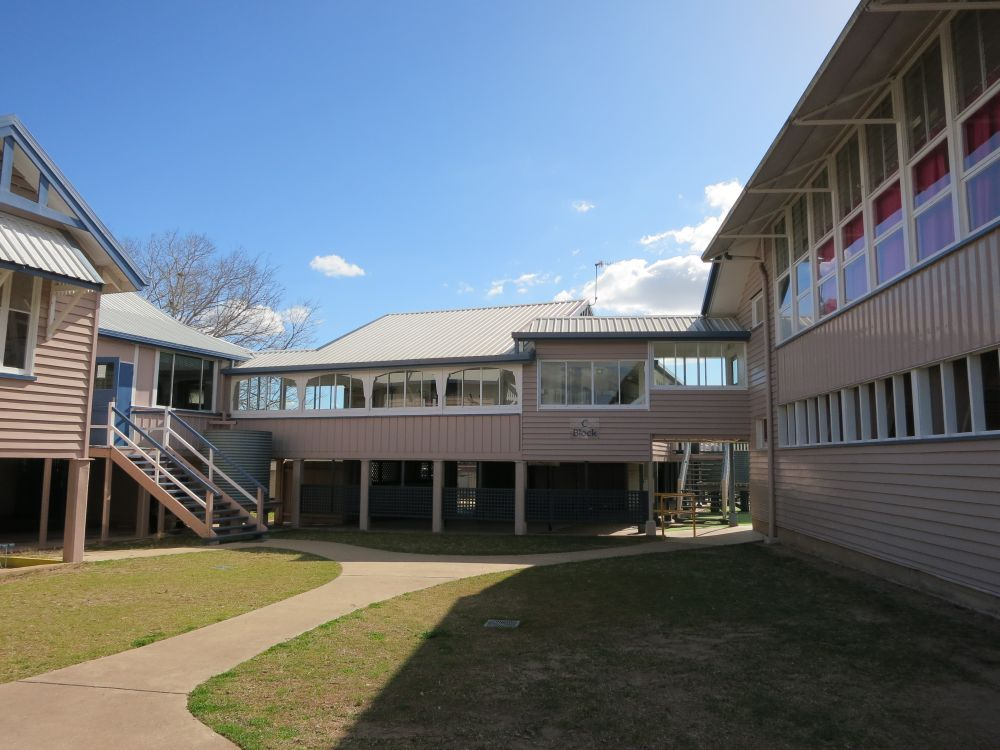
Block C from the south-east, 2015

The significant portion of Block C is the southeast classroom, a highset building with a gable roof and enclosed southeast verandah. Adjoining classrooms to the northwest and a verandah to the northeast (added in the 1960s) are not of cultural heritage significance.

The southwest wall is clad in weatherboards, with vertical batten gable infill and packed weatherboards at the gable peak. It retains a bank of early windows, comprising two-light casements with three-light fanlights above, shielded by a timber, skillion-roofed window hood.

The northeast wall has been re-lined below the verandah roof and early joinery removed, however above this level it retains its weatherboard cladding, vertical batten gable infill and packed weatherboards.

The verandah retains its timber posts with decorative, arched brackets; raked ceiling lined with VJ boards; and single skin verandah wall. The balustrade has been replaced with bagracks. An early four-panel timber door with two-light fanlight and original hardware survives in its original position in the centre of the verandah wall.

The interior is lined with VJ boards on the walls and ceiling (except for the northeast wall, which has been relined in flat sheeting). The ceiling is coved with a metal tie rod and central, square lattice ventilation panel. A four-panel timber door remains in the location of an original door at the southern end of the northwest wall.

The understorey is partially enclosed with weatherboard-clad walls and has a recent concrete slab floor. A small section of corrugated metal sheeting-clad wall is located beneath the walkway to Block A.

=== Playshed (1927) ===
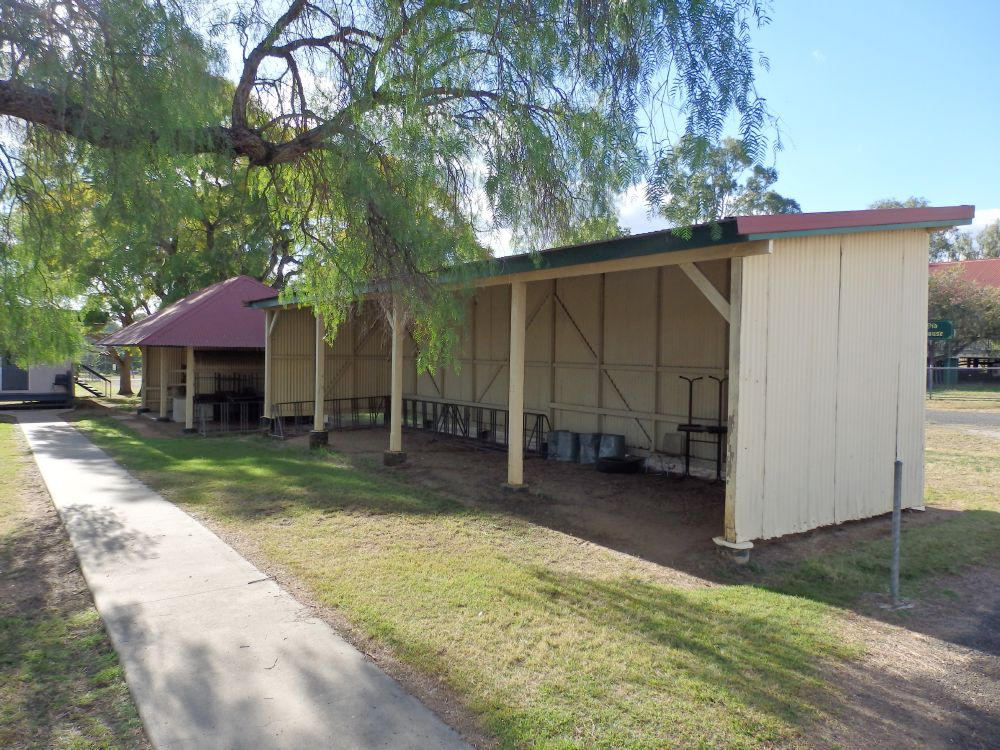
Playshed (left) and former Blacksmith's Shop (right), 2015

The playshed is a 6-post timber structure with a hipped roof clad in corrugated metal sheeting. It is enclosed on the northwest and northeast sides with vertically mounted, corrugated metal sheeting. The earth floor is paved in the northwest bay. Notches in the posts possibly indicate the location of a former balustrade around the southeast and southwest sides. The purpose and former location of a corrugated metal-clad shelving unit, standing in the centre of the playshed, is unclear.

=== Former blacksmith's shop (1930, extended 1936) ===
The former blacksmith's shop is a timber-framed, skillion-roofed shed of four bays with a corrugated metal-clad roof and an earth floor. Open along the southwest side, it is enclosed by timber-framed, corrugated metal-clad walls on the remaining three sides, with the whole structure resting on round concrete stumps.

=== Former domestic science building (1935–1936) ===
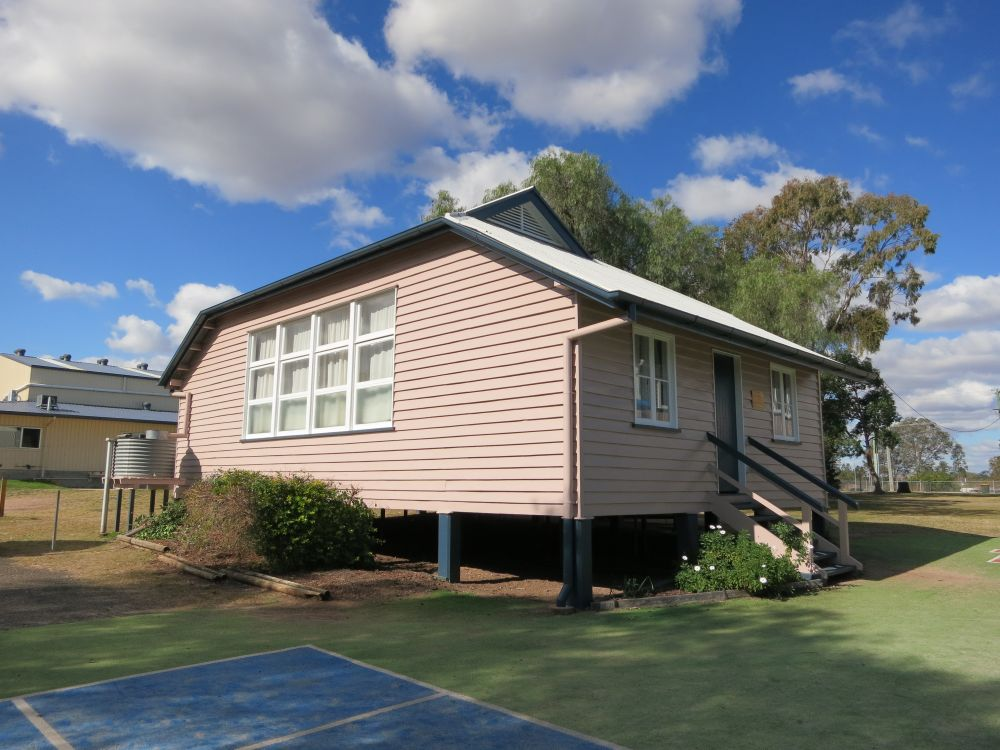
Former domestic science building, from west, 2015

The former domestic science building is a lowset timber building, clad in weatherboards and orientated to face southwest. It has a gambrel roof clad in corrugated metal sheeting, with louvred ventilation panels in the gablets. Access is via two sets of timber steps with timber handrails.

The building is divided by single-skin partitions into three rooms - a large room in the centre and narrower rooms (one an enclosed verandah) at either end. Walls and ceilings are lined with VJ boards. The main room has a picture rail and a flat ceiling with square lattice ventilation panel in the centre. The end rooms have raked ceilings.

Early windows, including two-light casements and three-light fanlights, survive in the southwest and northeast walls and in the northeast verandah wall. Internal doors have been removed, but two-light fanlights survive above the doorways. Windows and the former stove alcoves in the side walls have been replaced by large banks of awning windows. Two external doors survive - a high-waisted, part-glazed door in the southeast wall and a boarded door in the centre of the southwest wall.

=== Former Court House (1940) ===
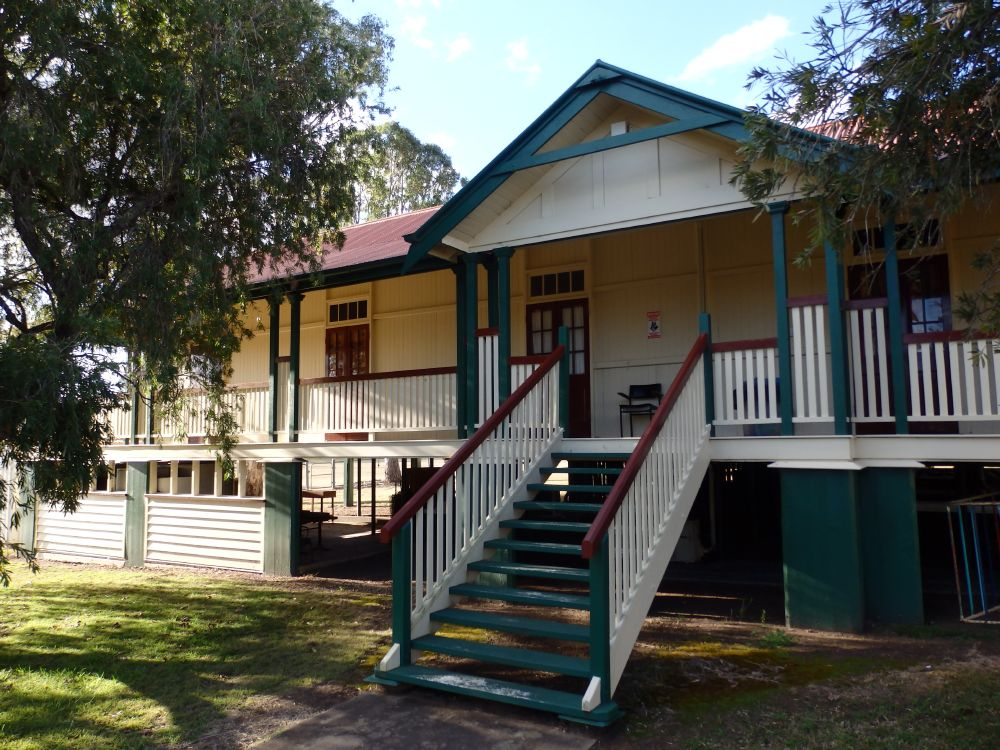
Former court house, from south-east, 2015

The former Court House is a lowset, timber building with a hipped and gabled roof clad in corrugated metal sheeting. T-shaped in plan and surrounded by wide verandahs, it is orientated to face southwest, with a gable-roofed entrance portico located in the centre of the main façade, accessed by timber steps.

A single row of six rooms (former offices) forms the front of the building and the large former court room is located at the rear. Rooms are accessed via the front and rear verandahs, with internal doorways connecting the central two rooms with the court room (doors leafs have been removed and a larger opening created in one wall).

The verandahs have a two-rail slat balustrade, raked ceilings lined with VJ boards, and single skin verandah walls. Timber verandah posts along the southwest verandah are paired and feature decorative cornices.

The building retains nearly all of its original timber joinery, including six-light double-hung sash windows with three-light fanlights, and half-glazed French doors with four-light fanlights. The northwest and southeast end walls are clad in weatherboards and have six-light casement windows with fanlights protected by skillion-roofed window hoods with battened brackets.

Internally, walls and ceilings are lined with v-jointed tongue and groove boards. Skirting boards are stepped with bullnose edges. The former offices have flat ceilings while the former court room ceiling is coved with a central square lattice ventilation panel. Non-significant internal features include modern carpet and linoleum floor linings, flat sheeting re-lining some partitions, windows in partition walls, and post-1970s fit-outs including a kitchen and former children's bathroom (now a store room).

The understorey has been partially enclosed with weatherboard-clad walls at the northern end, where the slope of the ground allows for enough head height. A separate storage area is enclosed with battened screens.

=== Grounds ===
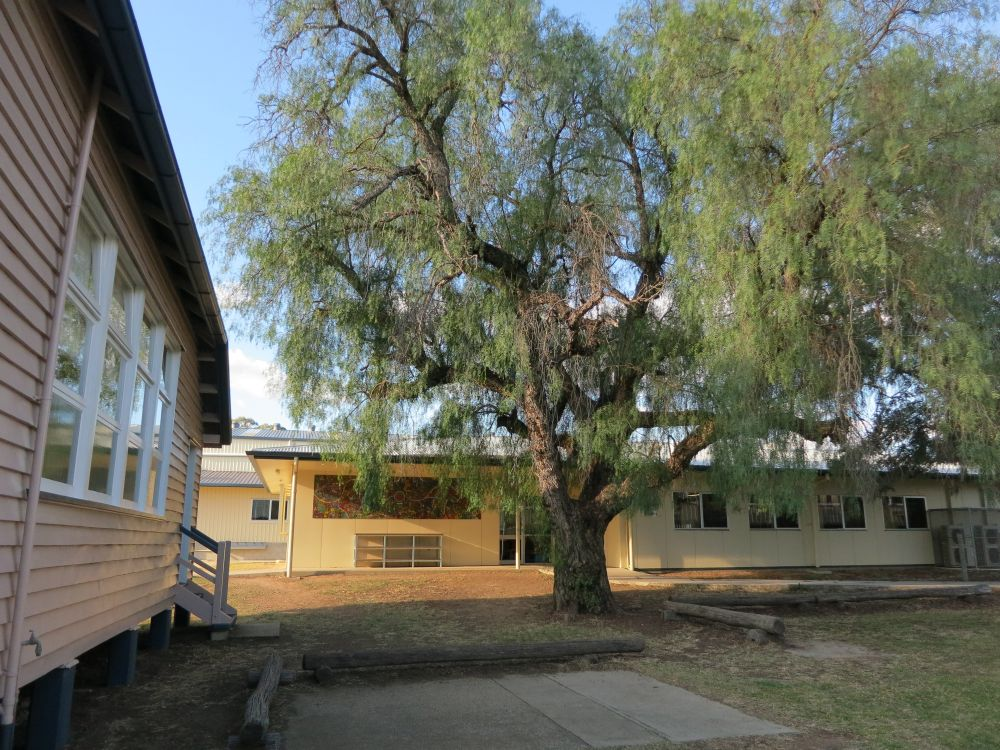
Pepperina tree beside the former domestic science building, 2015

A variety of mature trees survive within the school grounds, including eucalypts, jacarandas and elms (species unknown). Two mature pepperina trees (Shinus molle) are remnants of an early planting scheme. One is located to the south of the former blacksmith's shop, and the other to the east of the former domestic science building.

== Heritage listing ==
Murgon State School was listed on the Queensland Heritage Register on 9 October 2015 having satisfied the following criteria.

The place is important in demonstrating the evolution or pattern of Queensland's history.

Murgon State School (established in 1908 as a provisional school) is important in demonstrating the evolution of state education and its associated architecture in Queensland. The place retains excellent examples of standard government designs that were architectural responses to prevailing government educational philosophies.

The Suburban Timber School building (1917, extended 1935–36, Block A) demonstrates the evolution of timber school building designs to provide adequate lighting and ventilation; while its 1930s modifications, in particular the rearrangement of windows to provide southern light, illustrate the adaptability of timber schools and the influence of the highly successful sectional school type upon Queensland school designs from the 1920s to 1950s.

The teacher's residence (1914) demonstrates the Queensland Government's policy of providing residences for married male head teachers in rural areas.

The Playshed (1927) demonstrates the education system's recognition of the importance of play in the curriculum.

The domestic science building (1935–36) and blacksmith's shop (1930, extended 1936) are important surviving evidence of the establishment of rural schools in Queensland, a popular initiative to provide a practical education for country students and encourage them to stay on the land. They demonstrate the Queensland Government's focus on vocational education as a way of ensuring the state's economic prosperity.

The place demonstrates rare, uncommon or endangered aspects of Queensland's cultural heritage.

The former blacksmith's shop and domestic science building are rare and important surviving examples of building types that were once common, and demonstrate the emphasis placed on vocational training in Queensland Schools in the early-20th century, particularly in rural communities.

The former blacksmith's shop (1930, extended 1936) is a very rare and intact example of its type. No other surviving Queensland example with this level of intactness has been identified to date.

The place is important in demonstrating the principal characteristics of a particular class of cultural places.

Murgon State School is important in demonstrating the principal characteristics of Queensland state schools with their later modifications. These include: highset timber-framed teaching buildings of standard designs that incorporate understorey play areas, verandahs, and classrooms with high levels of natural light and ventilation; and generous, landscaped sites with mature shade trees and assembly/play areas. The school is a good, intact example of a regional school complex comprising a range of standard and vocational teaching buildings.

The Suburban Timber School building (1917, Block A) with its later additions (1935–36) retains its highset form with play space beneath, timber-framed and -clad construction, generous verandahs (now enclosed), gable roof, teachers rooms, surviving early joinery, coved ceiling lined with pressed metal sheeting, and natural lighting and ventilation features.

The small timber school building (1935–36, part of Block C) retains its gable roof, southeast verandah (now enclosed), some early joinery and decorative timberwork.

The teacher's residence (1914) is an excellent, intact example of the residence type of its period, retaining its hip-roofed, timber-framed and -clad form and comprising a front verandah, a four-room core, large dining verandah and rear wing containing a kitchen, bathroom and former servant's room.

The former domestic science building (1935–36) is a rare, intact example of a vocational building built to a standard plan, retaining its lowset form, gambrel roof, and large, airy classroom flanked by a former laundry room and an enclosed verandah.

The blacksmith's shop (1930, extended 1936) is a very rare and intact example of its type, retaining its skillion-roofed and corrugated metal-clad form, earth floor, and its location away from the main teaching building to minimise noise disruption.

The Playshed (1927) retains its hipped, timber-framed roof form supported on timber posts, and two walls enclosed with corrugated metal sheeting.

These buildings are set within landscaped school grounds with mature plantings, including pepperina trees (Schinus molle).

The former Court House (1939–40) is an excellent, intact example of a regional timber court house, retaining its T-shaped plan of former offices and courtroom, hipped and gabled roof, generous verandahs, and early joinery and decorative features.

The place has a strong or special association with a particular community or cultural group for social, cultural or spiritual reasons.

Schools have always played an important part in Queensland communities. They typically retain significant and enduring connections with former pupils, parents, and teachers; provide a venue for social interaction and volunteer work; and are a source of pride, symbolising local progress and aspirations.

Murgon State School has a strong and ongoing association with the Murgon community. It was established in 1908 through the fundraising efforts of the local community and generations of Murgon children have been taught there. The place is important for its contribution to the educational development of Murgon and is a prominent community focal point and gathering place for social and commemorative events with widespread community support.

== Notable students ==
- Bob Moore, Member of the Queensland Legislative Assembly
- Selwyn Cobbo, Winger for the Dolphins (NRL)

== See also ==
- History of state education in Queensland
- List of schools in Wide Bay–Burnett
