= Alfred James Jones =

Australian politician

The Honourable Alfred James Jones
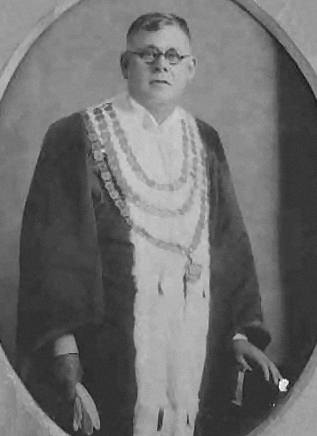

4th Lord Mayor of Brisbane
- In office 1934–1940
- Preceded by: Billy Greene
- Succeeded by: John Beals Chandler

Member of the Queensland Legislative Assembly for Burnett
- In office 27 August 1904 – 2 October 1909
- Preceded by: William Kent
- Succeeded by: Robert Hodge

Member of the Queensland Legislative Assembly for Maryborough
- In office 22 May 1915 – 14 February 1917
- Preceded by: Edward Corser
- Succeeded by: David Weir

Member of the Queensland Legislative Council
- In office 15 February 1917 – 16 September 1920
- In office 21 October 1920 – 24 February 1922

Member of the Queensland Legislative Assembly for Paddington
- In office 18 March 1922 – 11 May 1932
- Preceded by: John Fihelly
- Succeeded by: Seat abolished

Personal details
- Born: 4 October 1871 Gayndah, Queensland, Australia
- Died: 7 October 1945 (aged 74) Brisbane, Queensland, Australia
- Party: Labor
- Spouse: Martha Elizabeth Leggett
- Occupation: Drover, shopkeeper, gold miner

Alfred James Jones (4 October 1871 – 7 October 1945) was an Australian politician who served as a Member of the Queensland Legislative Assembly, a Member of the Queensland Legislative Council and as Lord Mayor of Brisbane.

== Early life ==
Alfred James Jones was born at Gayndah, Queensland, the son of Joseph Jones and his wife Ann (née Stevens). He received a basic education at Burnett State School and became a stockman and miner. He spent a short time teaching, was a Cobb & Co driver and spent six years mining.

He married Martha Elizabeth Leggett in Gayndah on 1 May 1895 and they had five sons and five daughters: Alfred Stevens, Claude Mills, Gladys Mary, Edward Joseph, Nellie Ann Millicent, Ina, Molly Nundah, Burnett Cranbrook, Allan Halley, and Dorothy Clara.

== Queensland Legislative Assembly ==
Jones contested four Legislative Assembly of Queensland seats for the Labor Party, and held three of them. He won Burnett in 1904 with 68% of the vote, but lost the seat after one term and failed to regain it in the 1912 election.

He won Maryborough in 1915 with about 56% of the vote. Jones resigned on 14 February 1917 to enter the upper house, the Queensland Legislative Council.

== Queensland Legislative Council ==
Jones was appointed to the Queensland Legislative Council on 14 February 1917, where he was the representative of the Government and also Minister for Mines.

He resigned from the Legislative Council on 16 September 1920 in order to contest the lower house seat of Carnarvon in 1920 but was not elected, and was returned to the upper house on 21 October 1920. He was one of the last members of the Queensland Legislative Council, as he led the vote to abolish the upper house in 1921, leading to its abolition on 3 March 1922.

== Return to Queensland Legislative Assembly ==
Jones won Paddington in 1922 and held the seat until 1932 when the district was abolished due to redistribution. Jones was Secretary for Mines for most of the period from 1917 to 1929.

On Saturday 28 March 1925, Jones officially opened the Windera railway line from Barlil to Windera in the Burnett area.

== Lord Mayor ==
Jones was Lord Mayor of Brisbane from 1934 to 1940. He attempted to solidify the Greater Brisbane vision of the 1925 amalgamation with a large system of civic loans.

=== 1934 Election ===
With universal suffrage restored to Brisbane City Council elections, Alfred Jones and the Labor Party won easily, picking up 14 of the 20 wards. Once again Brisbane was led by popularly elected Mayor.

=== 1937 Election ===
Harry Massey the independent Alderman for Toowong was convinced by the conservative Citizens' Municipal Organisation (CMO) (which was formed on 23 June 1936) to run as their Lord Mayoral candidate for the 1937 election. On 24 April 1937, Jones won easily, increasing his margin of victory. The CMO won two new wards to Labor's one for a net gain of 1 ward.

=== 1940 Election ===
Allegations that his administration was plagued by accusations of corruption and inefficiency lead to a complete Labor collapse in the 1940 election, when he lost the mayoralty to John Beals Chandler.

== Later life ==
Jones died in Brisbane General Hospital on 7 October 1945. His funeral service was held on 8 October 1945 at St John's Cathedral, after which he was cremated at the Mt Thompson Crematorium.

== Street name ==
A number of street names in the Brisbane suburb of Carina Heights are identical to the surnames of former Members of the Queensland Legislative Assembly. One of these is Jones Road.

== See also ==
- List of mayors and lord mayors of Brisbane

Civic offices
Preceded by John William Greene	Lord Mayor of Brisbane; 1934–1940	Succeeded by John Beals Chandler
Parliament of Queensland
Preceded by William Kent	Member for Burnett; 1904–1909	Succeeded by Robert Hodge
Preceded by Edward Corser	Member for Maryborough; 1915–1917	Succeeded by David Weir
Preceded by John Fihelly	Member for Paddington; 1922–1932	Abolished
