= Windera, Queensland =

Windera
- Town
- Interactive map of Windera
- Coordinates: 26.045°S 151.8305°E
- Country: Australia
- State: Queensland
- LGAs: South Burnett Region; Gympie Region
- Location: 29.3 km (18.2 mi) NNW of Murgon; 68.9 km (42.8 mi) N of Kingaroy; 113 km (70 mi) W of Gympie; 228 km (142 mi) N of Toowoomba; 288 km (179 mi) NNW of Brisbane
- Established: 1877

Government
  - State electorate: Nanango
  - Federal division: Wide Bay

Area
  - Total: 142.9 km^{2} (55.2 sq mi)

Population
  - Total: 105 (2021 census)
  - Density: 0.735/km^{2} (1.903/sq mi)
- Time zone: UTC+10:00 (AEST)
- Postcode: 4605
Localities around Windera
| Stonelands | Booubyjan | Booubyjan |
| Stonelands | Windera | Kitoba |
| Stonelands | Glenrock | Cloyna |

Windera is a town in the South Burnett Region and a locality split between the South Burnett Region and the Gympie Region in Queensland, Australia. In the 2021 census, the locality of Windera had a population of 105 people.

== Geography ==
Windera was the terminus of the Windera railway line, a branch line from the Murgon-to-Proston railway line. Both lines are now closed.

== History ==
Land in Windera was open for selection on 17 April 1877; 91 square miles (240 km^{2}) were available.

Windera Creek Provisional School opened on 13 May 1920, later becoming Windera Creek State School. In the late 1930s or early 1940s it was renamed Windera State School.

The town was originally shown on a 1924 survey plan as Kantara with the railway station named Jelanga, assigned by the Queensland Railways Department on 18 March 1924. However, on 2 August 1924, the station was renamed Windera after a pastoral run operated from 1849 by pastoralist Paul Lawless. The town name changed to match the railway station.

On Saturday 28 March 1925, a 12-mile (19 km) long Windera railway line from Barlil to Windera was officially opened by Alfred James Jones, the Minister for Mines and formerly the Member of the Queensland Legislative Assembly for Burnett.

The Anglican Church of the Holy Trinity was dedicated on 24 May 1957 by Archdeacon Richards. Its closure on 3 June 2005 was approved by Assistant Bishop Rob Nolan.

== Demographics ==
In the 2016 census, the locality of Windera had a population of 93 people.

In the 2021 census, the locality of Windera had a population of 105 people.

== Education ==
Windera State School is a government primary (Prep-6) school for boys and girls at 2588 Gayndah Murgon Road (26.0528°S 151.8289°E). In 2018, the school had an enrolment of 8 students with 2 teachers (1 full-time equivalent) and 4 non-teaching staff (2 full-time equivalent).

There are no secondary schools in Windera. The nearest government secondary schools are Proston State School (to Year 10) in Proston to the south-west and Murgon State High School (to Year 12) in Murgon to the south-east.
