= Cloyna, Queensland =

Cloyna
- Suburb
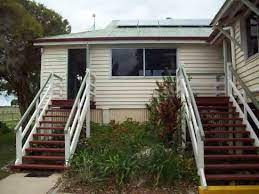
- Cloyna State School, 2012

- Interactive map of Cloyna
- Coordinates: 26.1058°S 151.8424°E
- Country: Australia
- State: Queensland
- LGA: South Burnett Region
- Location: 21.3 km (13.2 mi) NNW of Murgon; 60.4 km (37.5 mi) N of Kingaroy; 113 km (70 mi) W of Gympie; 277 km (172 mi) NW of Brisbane

Government
  - State electorate: Nanango
  - Federal division: Wide Bay

Area
  - Total: 30.9 km^{2} (11.9 sq mi)

Population
  - Total: 160 (2021 census)
  - Density: 5.18/km^{2} (13.4/sq mi)
- Time zone: UTC+10:00 (AEST)
- Postcode: 4605
Suburbs around Cloyna
Glenrock	Windera	Kitoba
Wooroonden	Cloyna	Sunny Nook
Silverleaf	Warnung	Merlwood

Cloyna is a rural locality in the South Burnett Region, Queensland, Australia. In the 2021 census, Cloyna had a population of 160 people.

== History ==
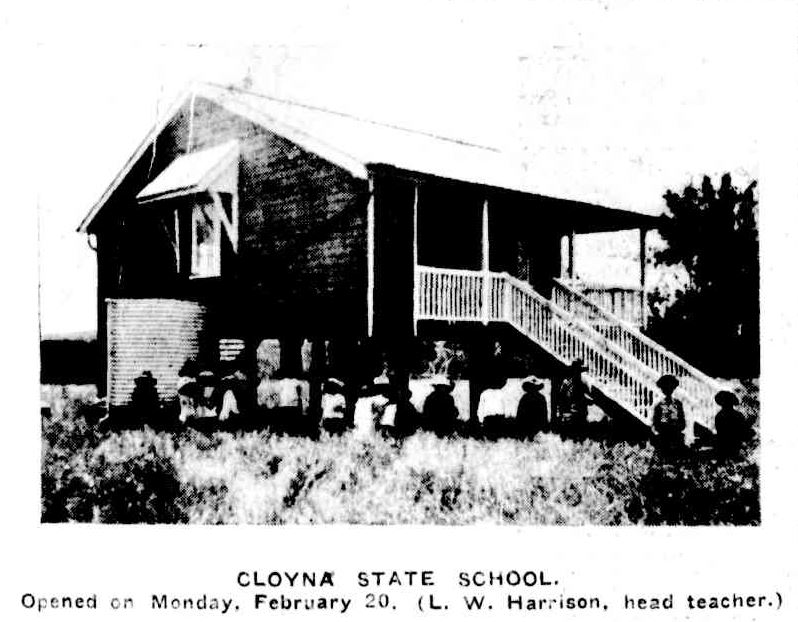
Coyna State School, opened on Monday 20 February 1911

Cloyna State School opened on 20 February 1911 under headmaster Leslie Ward Harrison.

The construction of the Lutheran Church was completed in May 1911 with the church officially opening on Coronation Day, 22 June 1911.

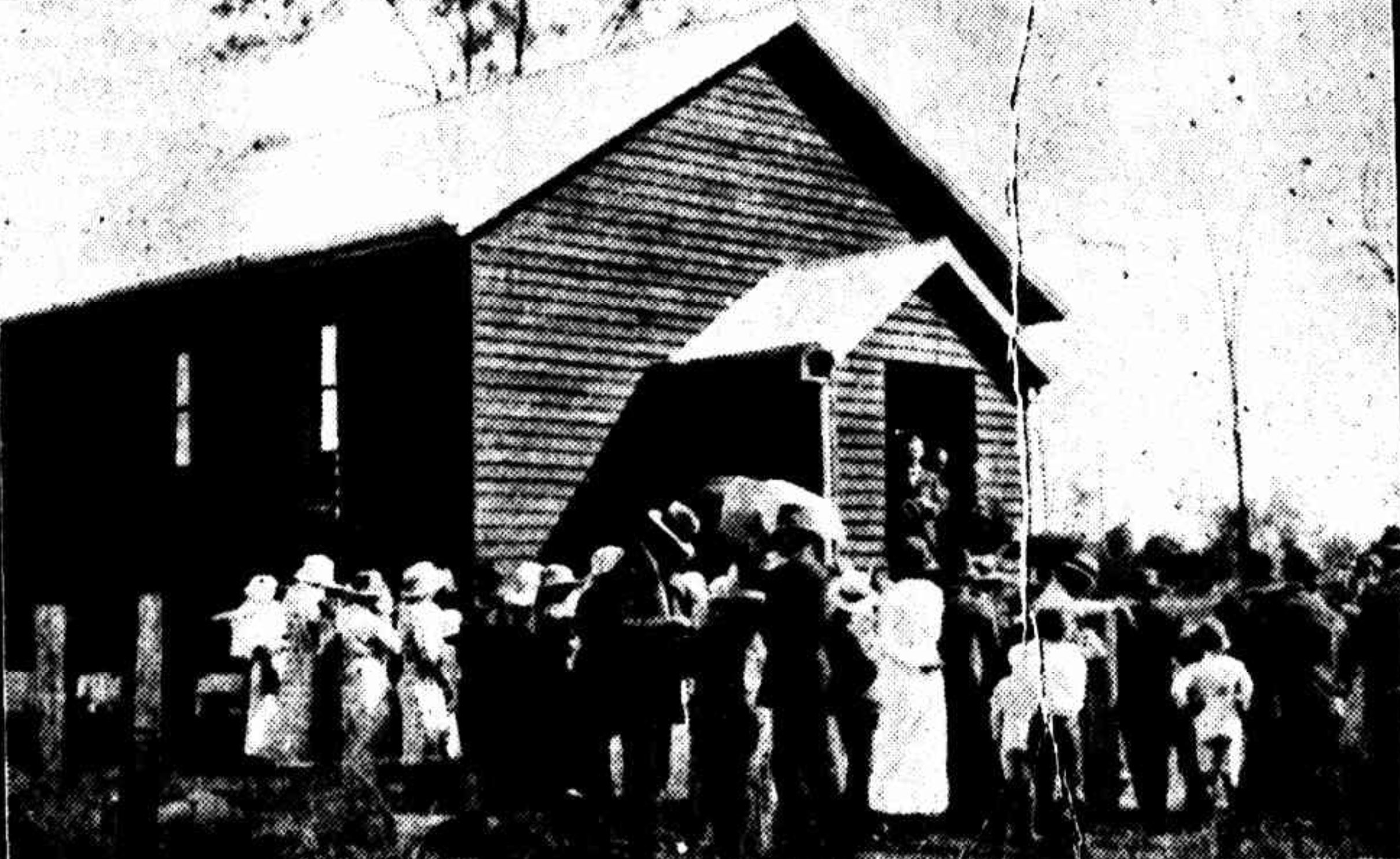
Opening ceremony at Cloyna Baptist Church, 14 March 1924

Cloyna Baptist Church opened in 1924. It was officially opened on 15 March 1924. It closed circa 1990. It was located at 71 Cloyna West Road (26.1089°S 151.8379°E). It was close to the Cloyna railway station. It is now in private ownership.

The former Cloyna railway station (26.1085°S 151.8391°E) was on the now-closed Windera railway line. The line operated from 1925 to 1961.

In 2007, the building of the former Anglican Church of the Holy Trinity at 2272 Gayndah Road, Kitoba, was relocated to Cloyna State School. The church was opened on 24 May 1957 by Archdeacon Richards. It was closed on 3 June 2005 by Assistant Bishop Nolan.

== Demographics ==
In the 2016 census Cloyna had a population of 142 people.

In the 2021 census, Cloyna had a population of 160 people.

== Education ==
Cloyna State School is a government primary (Prep–6) school for boys and girls at 8 William Webber Road (26.1073°S 151.8461°E). In 2018, the school had an enrolment of 15 students with 4 teachers (3 full-time equivalent) and 4 non-teaching staff (2 full-time equivalent).

There are no secondary schools in Cloyna. The nearest government secondary school is Murgon State High School in Murgon to the south-east. There is also a Catholic primary school in Murgon.
