= Wheatlands, Queensland =

Wheatlands
- Suburb
- Interactive map of Wheatlands
- Coordinates: 26.2191°S 151.8552°E
- Country: Australia
- State: Queensland
- LGA: South Burnett Region
- Location: 12.3 km (7.6 mi) W of Murgon; 43.1 km (26.8 mi) N of Kingaroy; 104 km (65 mi) W of Gympie; 270 km (170 mi) NW of Brisbane

Government
  - State electorate: Nanango
  - Federal division: Flynn

Area
  - Total: 33.3 km^{2} (12.9 sq mi)

Population
  - Total: 82 (2021 census)
  - Density: 2.462/km^{2} (6.38/sq mi)
- Time zone: UTC+10:00 (AEST)
- Postcode: 4606
Suburbs around Wheatlands
Byee	Byee	Barlil
Silverleaf	Wheatlands	Murgon
Chelmsford	Wondai	Ficks Crossing

Wheatlands is a rural locality in the South Burnett Region, Queensland, Australia. In the 2021 census, Wheatlands had a population of 82 people.

== Geography ==
Barambah Creek forms the northern and eastern boundaries of the locality.

The land use is a mixture of crop growing and grazing on native vegetation.

== History ==
Wheatlands State School opened on 17 November 1913.

== Demographics ==
In the 2016 census, Wheatlands had a population of 88 people.

In the 2021 census, Wheatlands had a population of 82 people.

== Education ==
Wheatlands State School is a government primary (Prep-6) school for boys and girls at 422 Byee Road (26.2241°S 151.8459°E). In 2018, the school had an enrolment of 75 students with 7 teachers (5 full-time equivalent) and 5 non-teaching staff (3 full-time equivalent).

There are no secondary schools in Wheatlands. The nearest are Wondai State School (to Year 9) in neighbouring Wondai to the south and Murgon State High School (to Year 12) in neighbouring Murgon to the east.
