= South Burnett Region =

Coordinates: 26°32′25.6″S 151°50′20.3″E

- Local government area
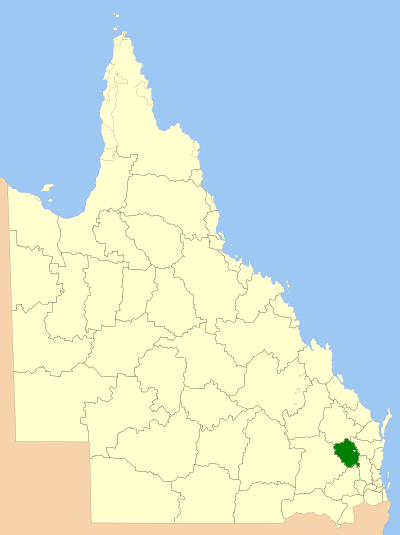
- Location within Queensland

- Interactive map of South Burnett Region
- Country: Australia
- State: Queensland
- Established: 2008
- Council seat: Kingaroy

Government
  - Mayor: Kathy Duff
  - State electorate: Nanango
  - Federal divisions: Maranoa; Wide Bay; Flynn

Area
  - Total: 8,382 km^{2} (3,236 sq mi)

Population
  - Total: 32,996 (2021 census)
  - Density: 3.93653/km^{2} (10.1956/sq mi)
- Website: South Burnett Region
LGAs around South Burnett Region
North Burnett	North Burnett	Gympie, Cherbourg
Western Downs	South Burnett Region	Gympie, Somerset
Western Downs	Toowoomba	Somerset

The South Burnett Region is a local government area in the South Burnett district of Queensland, Australia.

In the 2021 census, the South Burnett Region had a population of 32,996 people.

== Geography ==
The South Burnett Region covers an area 8,382 square kilometres (3,236 sq mi), containing a population of 32,555 in June 2018 and has an estimated operating budget of A$42 m (as at 2008).

The Aboriginal Shire of Cherbourg is an enclave within the South Burnett Region, but is not part of it administratively as it has its own local government.

== History ==
This Local Government was created in March 2008 as a result of the report of the Local Government Reform Commission released in July 2007.

Prior to the 2008 amalgamation, the South Burnett Region, located in the southern catchment of the Burnett River, existed as four distinct local government areas:

- the Shire of Kingaroy;
- the Shire of Nanango;
- the Shire of Murgon;
- and the Shire of Wondai.

The report recommended the new local government area should not be divided into wards and should elect six councilors and a mayor however the Interim Steering Committee applied to the State Government for four wards based on the old shire boundaries. As the total population is just a few hundred short of the level set in the report for eight councilors and a mayor, application for this was also made.

== Demographics ==
In the 2011 census, the South Burnett Region had a population of 31,028 people.

In the 2016 census, the South Burnett Region had a population of 32,186 people.

In the 2021 census, the South Burnett Region had a population of 32,996 people.

== Towns and localities ==
The South Burnett Region includes the following settlements:

Kingaroy area:

- Coolabunia
- Ellesmere
- Goodger
- Haly Creek
- Inverlaw
- Kingaroy
- Kumbia
- Memerambi
- Taabinga
- Wooroolin

Nanango area:

- Benarkin
- Benarkin North
- Blackbutt
- Brooklands
- Bunya Mountains
- East Nanango
- Glan Devon
- Maidenwell
- Nanango
- South East Nanango
- Taromeo

Murgon area:

- Cloyna
- Moffatdale
- Murgon
- Tablelands
- Windera
- Wooroonden

Wondai area:

- Boondooma
- Cushnie
- Durong
- Ficks Crossing
- Hivesville
- Mondure
- Proston
- Tingoora
- Wheatlands
- Wondai

Others areas:

- Booie
- Byee
- Crawford
- Glenrock
- Gordonbrook
- Ironpot
- Kawl Kawl
- Marshlands
- Runnymede
- Silverleaf
- Tarong
- Wattle Camp

== Libraries ==
The South Burnett Regional Council operate public libraries at Blackbutt, Kingaroy, Murgon, Nanango, Proston, and Wondai.

== Council ==
=== Current composition ===
The current council, elected in 2020, is:

Ward	Councillor	Party
Mayor	Brett Otto	Independent
Division 1	Roz Frohloff	Independent
Division 2	Gavin Jones	Independent
Division 3	Danita Potter	Independent
Division 4	Kirstie Schumacher	Independent
Division 5	Kathy Duff	Independent LNP
Division 6	Scott Henschen	Independent

== Mayors ==
=== 2008–present ===
No.	Portrait	Mayor	Party	Term start	Term end	Council control (term)
1		David Carter	Independent	15 March 2008	28 April 2012	Independents majority (2008–present)
2		Wayne Kratzmann	Independent	28 April 2012	19 March 2016	Independents majority (2008–present)
3		Keith Campbell	Independent	19 March 2016	29 March 2020	Independents majority (2008–present)
4		Brett Otto	Independent	29 March 2020	16 March 2024	Independents majority (2008–present)
5		Kathy Duff	Independent	16 March 2024	incumbent	Independents majority (2008–present)

== Past councillors ==
=== 2008−present ===
Year	Division 1		Division 2		Division 3		Division 4		Division 5		Division 6	
Year	Councillor	Party	Councillor	Party	Councillor	Party	Councillor	Party	Councillor	Party	Councillor	Party
2008	Barry Green	Independent	Debra Palmer	Independent	Damien Tessmann	Independent	Keith Campbell	Independent	Kathy Duff	Independent LNP	Cheryl Dalton	Independent
2012	Barry Green	Independent	Debra Palmer	Independent	Damien Tessmann	Independent	Keith Campbell	Independent	Kathy Duff	Independent LNP	Cheryl Dalton	Independent
2016	Roz Frohloff	Independent	Gavin Jones	Independent	Danita Potter	Independent	Terry Fleischfresser	Independent	Kathy Duff	Independent LNP	Ros Heit	Independent
2020	Roz Frohloff	Independent	Gavin Jones	Independent	Danita Potter	Independent	Kirstie Schumacher	Independent	Kathy Duff	Independent LNP	Scott Henschen	Independent
