= Murgon =

- Town
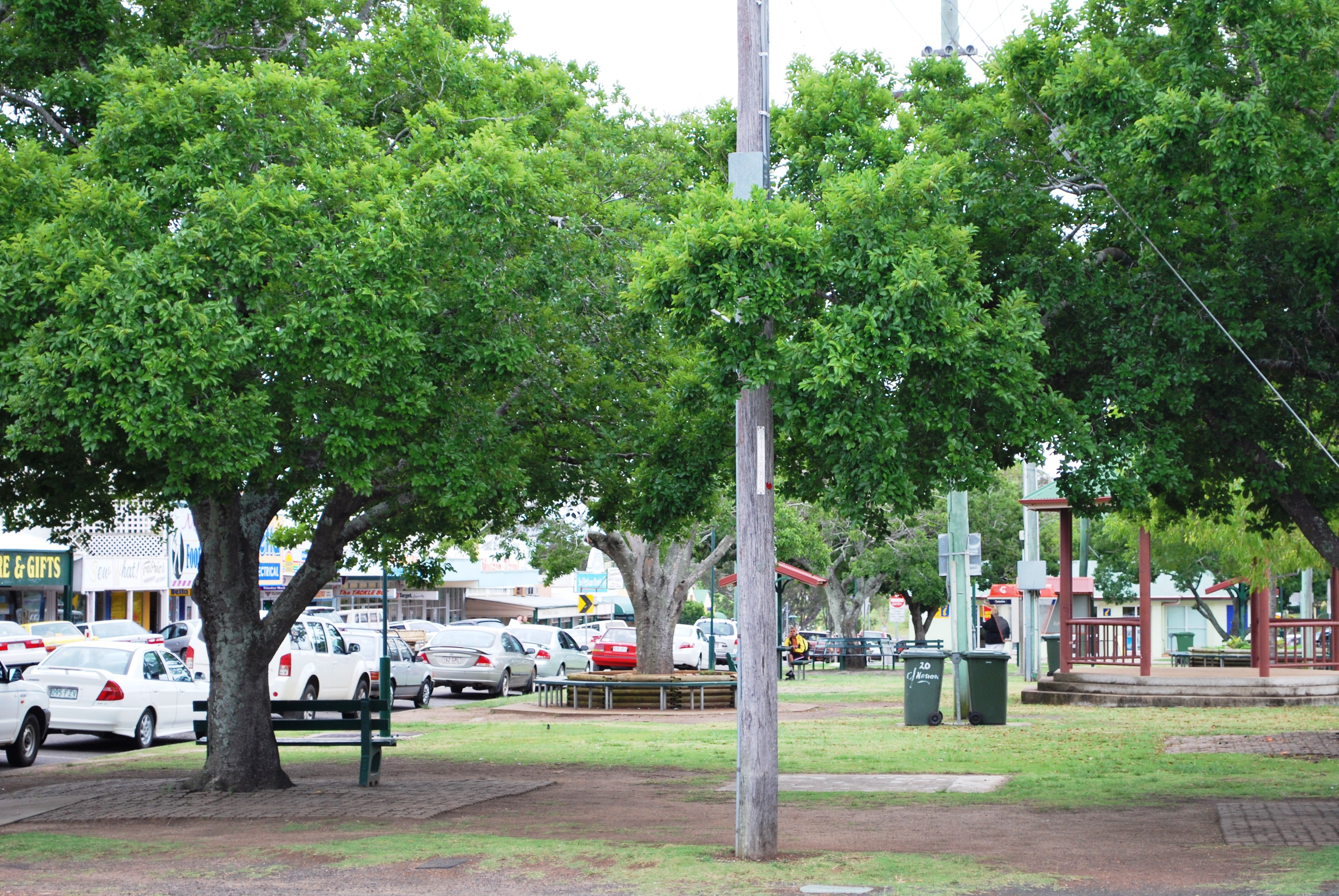
- The park on the main street of Murgon

- Interactive map of Murgon
- Coordinates: 26.2416°S 151.9413°E
- Country: Australia
- State: Queensland
- LGA: South Burnett Region
- Location: 45.5 km (28.3 mi) NNE of Kingaroy; 92.7 km (57.6 mi) W of Gympie; 247 km (153 mi) NW of Brisbane

Government
  - State electorate: Nanango
  - Federal division: Wide Bay

Area
  - Total: 66.0 km^{2} (25.5 sq mi)
- Elevation: 316 m (1,037 ft)

Population
  - Total: 2,220 (2021 census)
  - Density: 33.64/km^{2} (87.12/sq mi)
- Time zone: UTC+10:00 (AEST)
- Postcode: 4605
Localities around Murgon
Oakdale; Barlil	Tablelands	Manyung
Wheatlands	Murgon	Moondooner
Ficks Crossing	Cherbourg	Redgate; Moffatdale

Murgon (/mɜːrɡən/) is a rural town and locality in the South Burnett Region, Queensland, Australia. In the 2021 census, the locality of Murgon had a population of 2,220.

== Geography ==
Murgon is in the region of Queensland known as the South Burnett, the southern part of the Burnett River catchment. Industries include peanuts, dairy farming, beef and cattle production and wine. The Indigenous Australian settlement of Cherbourg is just south of Murgon.

== History ==
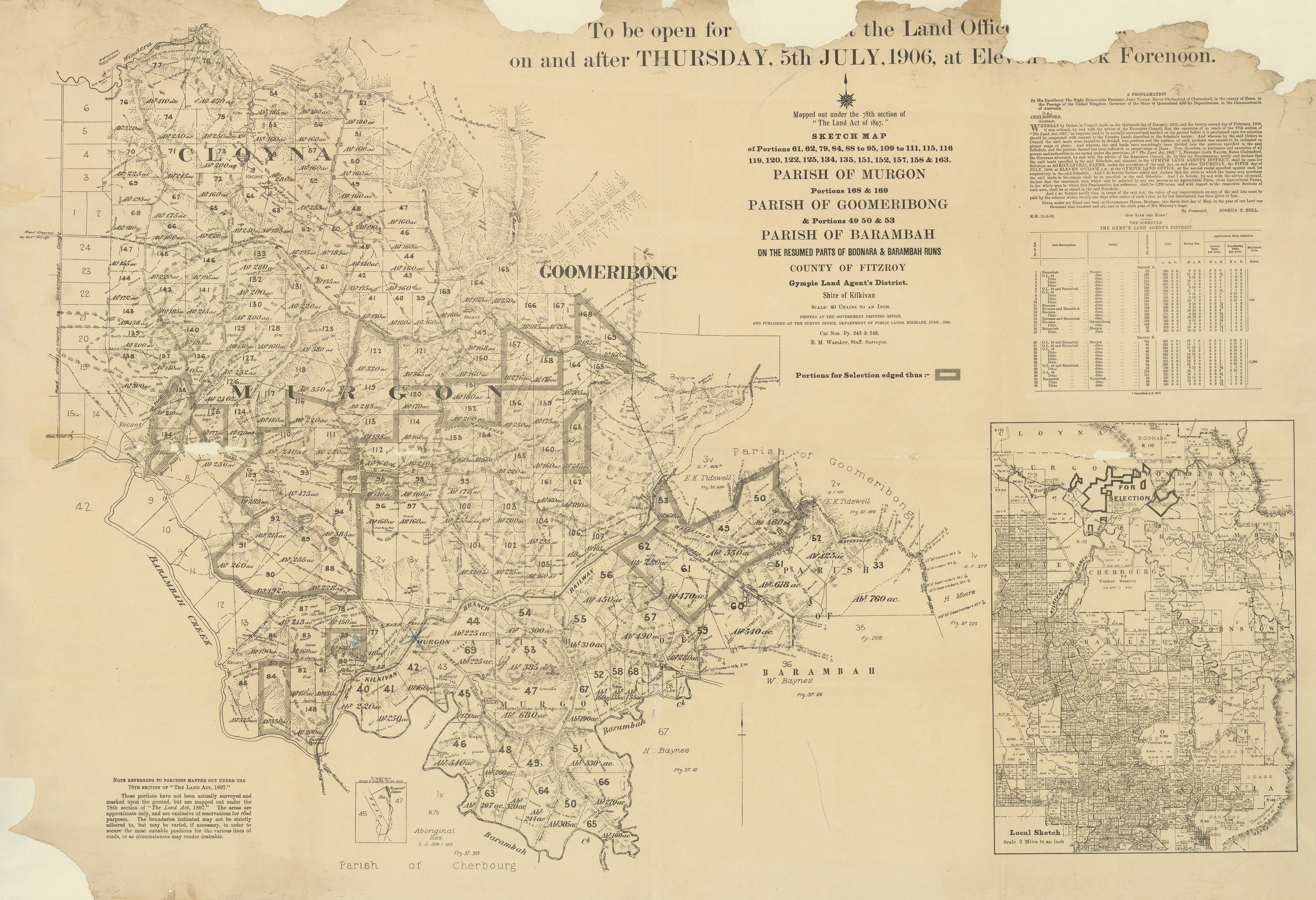
Land sales map, 1906

Wakka Wakka (Waka Waka, Wocca Wocca, Wakawaka) is an Australian Aboriginal language spoken in the Burnett River catchment. The Wakka Wakka language region includes the landscape within the local government boundaries of the North and South Burnett Regional Council, particularly the towns of Cherbourg, Murgon, Kingaroy, Gayndah, Eidsvold and Mundubbera.

Opened on 14 September 1903, the fourth stage of the Nanango railway line took the line from Goomeri south to Wondai after passing through Manyung, Moondooner and Murgon, with the town served by Murgon railway station. The fifth stage, opened on 19 December 1904, terminated at Kingaroy.

In July 1906, 32 allotments were advertised for selection by the Department of Public Lands Office. The map advertising the land selection states the allotments are portions in the Parishes of Murgon, Goomeribong and Barambah. The portions were left over from 5 April.

Murgon State School opened on 24 February 1908.

Murgon Post Office opened by June 1908 (a receiving office had been open from 1904).

The first Murgon Methodist Church was officially opened on Sunday 4 October 1908. The foundation stone of the current Murgon Methodist Church (now the Murgon Goomeri Uniting Church) was laid on 17 March 1962. The current church opened in 1963.

The foundation stone of the Murgon War Memorial was laid on 25 April 1920 (ANZAC Day) by Lieutenant Colonel Wilder Neligan. On 11 November 1921, the digger memorial was dedicated by RSL chairman, Major General Spencer Browne.

The town was the administrative centre for the former Shire of Murgon which existed from 1914 until 2008.

Christ Church Anglican was dedicated in 1920. It closed in October 2023. It was at 29 Taylor Street East (26.2466°S 151.9423°E).

Murgon Baptist Church opened on Sunday 30 October 1921. A tender to build the church was accepted in August 1921. On 31 July 1930, a new Baptist church was officially opened. The current church was opened in 1965, while the original church was sold to the Church of Christ in 1961.

St Joseph's Catholic School opened 27 February 1937.

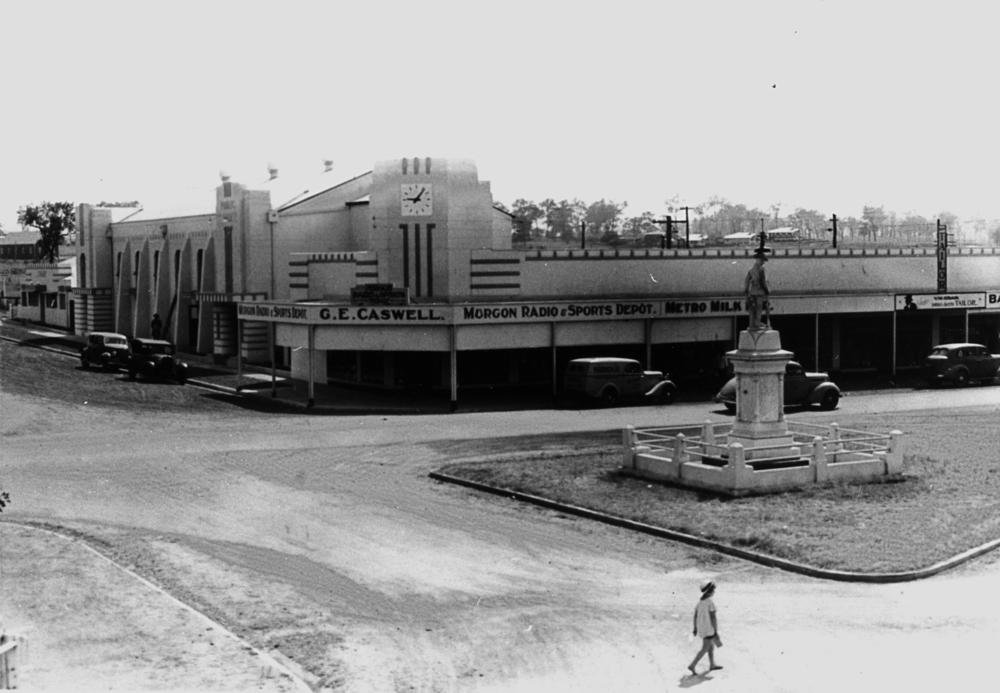
War Memorial and Civic Centre in Lamb Street, Murgon, 1938

Murgon State High School opened on 27 January 1959.

Murgon Special School closed on 31 December 1980.

The 1986 Bruce Beresford feature film The Fringe Dwellers featuring the fictional town of 'Curgon' was based on and shot in Murgon. The 'Family Camp' set was located at the far end of Ashton Street. The film is acclaimed as being the first Australian film featuring Indigenous actors in all the major roles, and won Best Adapted Screenplay at the AACTA Awards.

The Theebine to Kingaroy railway line fell into disuse by 2004, and was officially closed in early 2010. All tracks (with the exception of some sidings) were eventually removed to make way for the Kingaroy-Kilkivan Rail trail which was opened in Spring 2017.

The current Murgon Library facility opened in 2010.

== Demographics ==
In the 2021 census, the locality of Murgon had a population of 2,220.

In the 2016 census, the locality of Murgon had a population of 2,378.

== Heritage listings ==
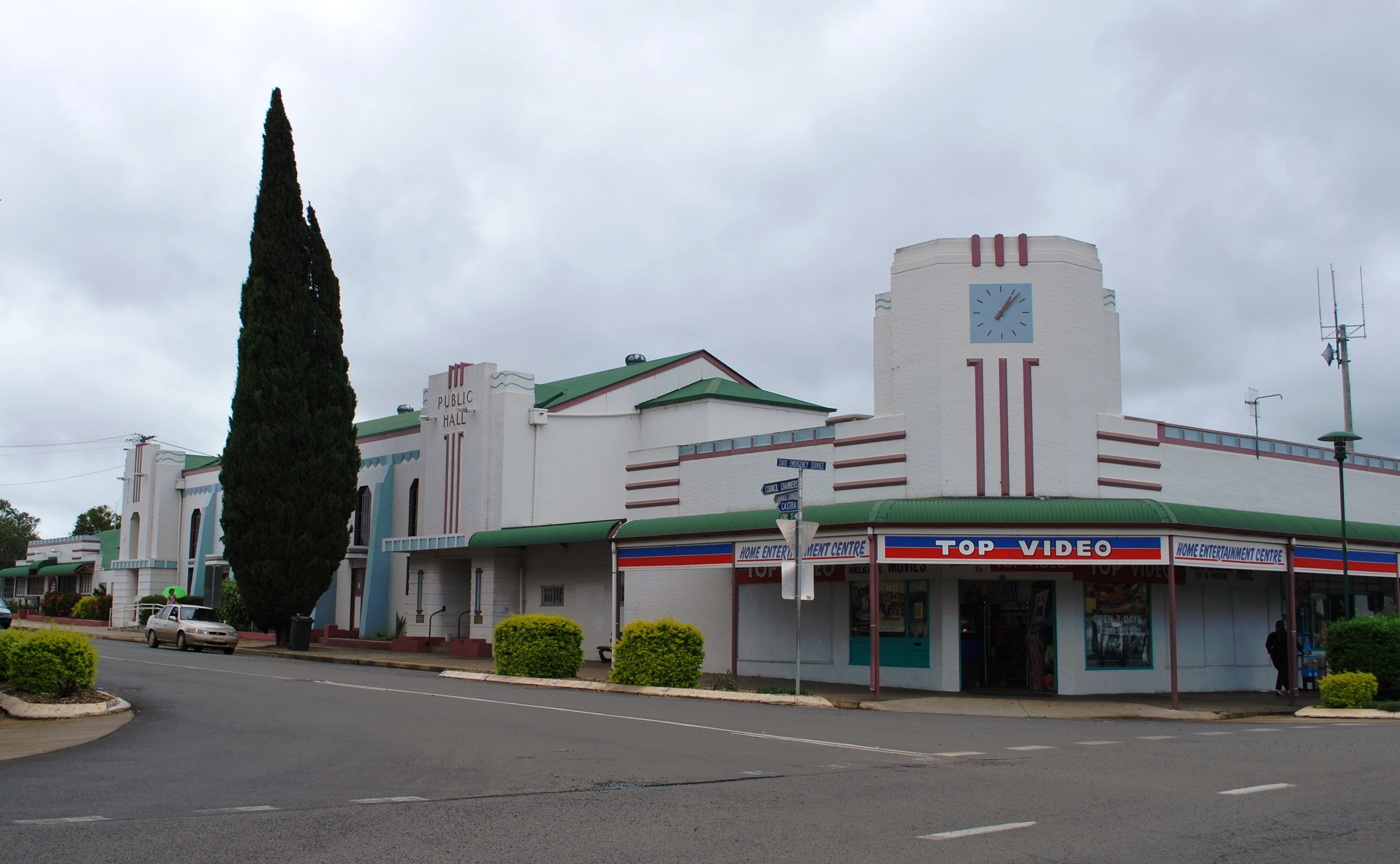
Civic Centre, 2008

Murgon has a number of heritage-listed sites, including:

- Murgon State School, 91 Gore Street
- Murgon Civic Centre, 62–70 Lamb Street
- former South Burnett Co-operative Dairy Association Factory, Macalister Street

== Fossils ==
Murgon is also close to a famous fossil site. The Murgon fossil site is the only such site in Australia with a diverse vertebrate fauna dating to the early Eocene epoch, around 55 million years ago, only 10 million years after the extinction of the dinosaurs.

== Education ==
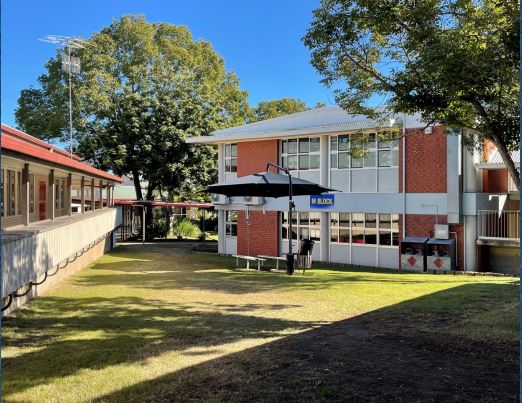
Murgon State High School, 2022

Murgon State School is a government primary (Early Childhood to Year 6) school for boys and girls at 91 Gore Street (26.2397°S 151.9433°E). In 2018, the school had an enrolment of 242 students with 21 teachers and 23 non-teaching staff (14 full-time equivalent). It includes a special education program.

St Joseph's School is a Catholic primary (Prep–6) school for boys and girls at 32 Angel Avenue (26.2394°S 151.9462°E). In 2018, the school had an enrolment of 107 students with 12 teachers and 14 non-teaching staff (9 full-time equivalent).

Murgon State High School is a government secondary (7–12) school for boys and girls at 2 Dutton Street (26.2372°S 151.9446°E). In 2018, the school had an enrolment of 347 students with 43 teachers (41 full-time equivalent) and 30 non-teaching staff (24 full-time equivalent). It includes a special education program.

== Amenities ==
The South Burnett Regional Council operates a public library in Murgon at 42 Stephens Street West (26.2407°S 151.9421°E). Public Wi-Fi is available at this facility.

There are a number of churches in Murgon, including:

- St Joseph's Catholic Church, 24 Angel Avenue (26.2393°S 151.9466°E)
- Murgon Goomeri Uniting Church, 55 Gore Street (26.2437°S 151.9395°E)

== Attractions ==
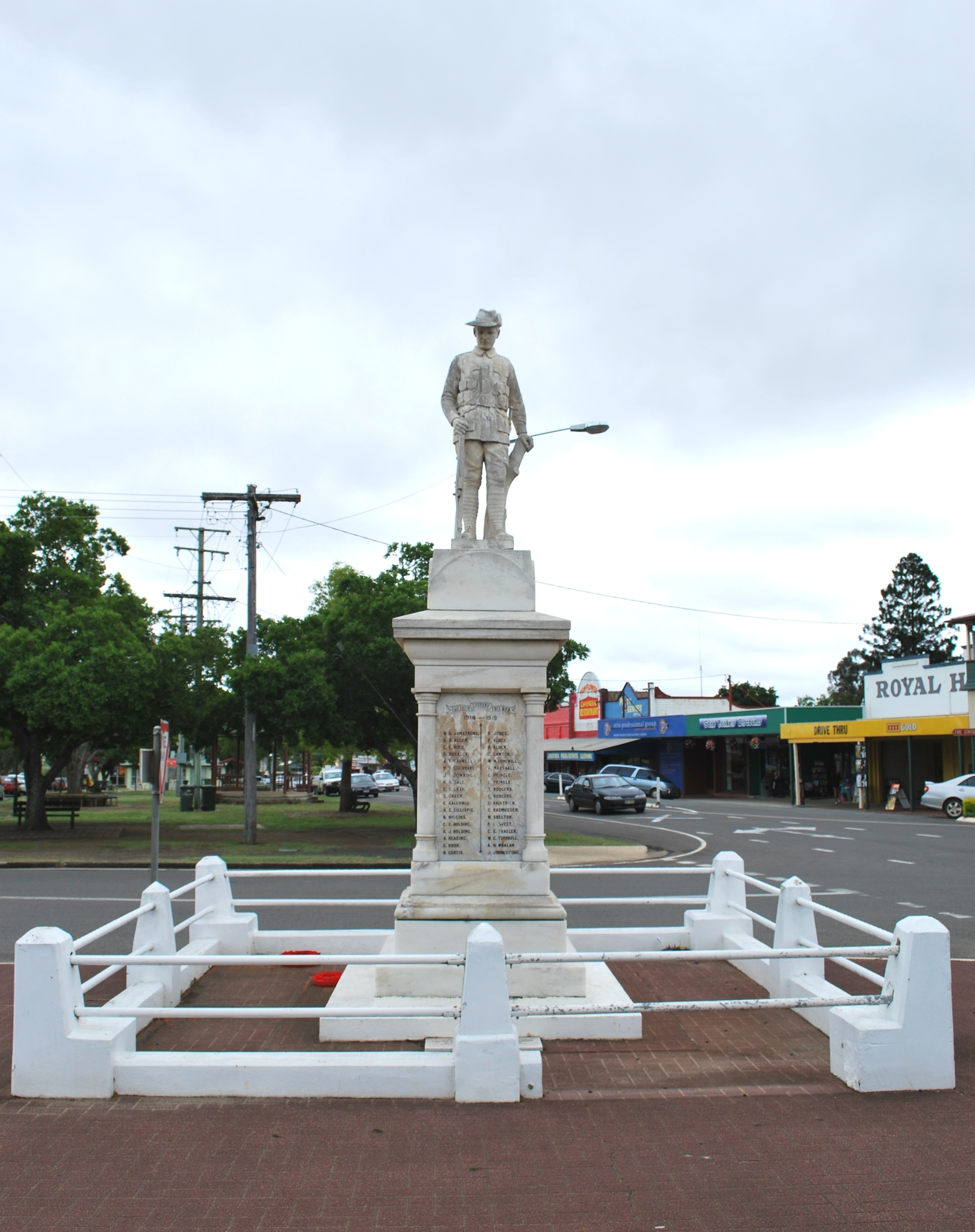
Murgon War Memorial, 2008

Attractions of Murgon include winemaking, fishing on the nearby Bjelke-Petersen Dam and gem-fossicking.

The Queensland Dairy and Heritage Museum is at 2 Sommerville Street (26.2307°S 151.9291°E).

The Kilkivan to Kingaroy Rail Trail follows the old railway line between the two towns. It is 88 kilometres (55 mi) long and passes through Goomeri, Murgon, Wondai, Tingoora, Wooroolin, Memerambi, and Crawford. The trail from Kilkivan to Murgon is unsealed. Queensland's first and longest sealed rail trail section of 44 kilometres (27 mi) from Murgon to Kingaroy is for walkers and cyclists only. Short distances between towns means coffee is never far away. It passes the Local Heritage listed Railway Complex which includes the former railway station and station master's residence, and what were a goods shed and platforms, and some railway tracks and the remains of the water tank stand.

== Sport ==
Murgon has a vibrant sporting society. The Murgon Mustangs play rugby league in the South Burnett competition.

== Notable residents ==
Notable residents of Murgon include:

- Rod Ansell, Australian bushman and the inspiration for Crocodile Dundee (character), born in Murgon
- Gavin Cooper, Australian rugby league player born in Murgon
- Dustin Cooper, Australian rugby league player born in Murgon
- John Mickel, Member of the Queensland Legislative Assembly born in Murgon
- Leah Purcell, Australian actress, director and writer was born in Murgon
- Steve Renouf, Australian rugby league player born in Murgon

== See also ==
- List of fossil sites
