= Kingaroy Shire Council Chambers =

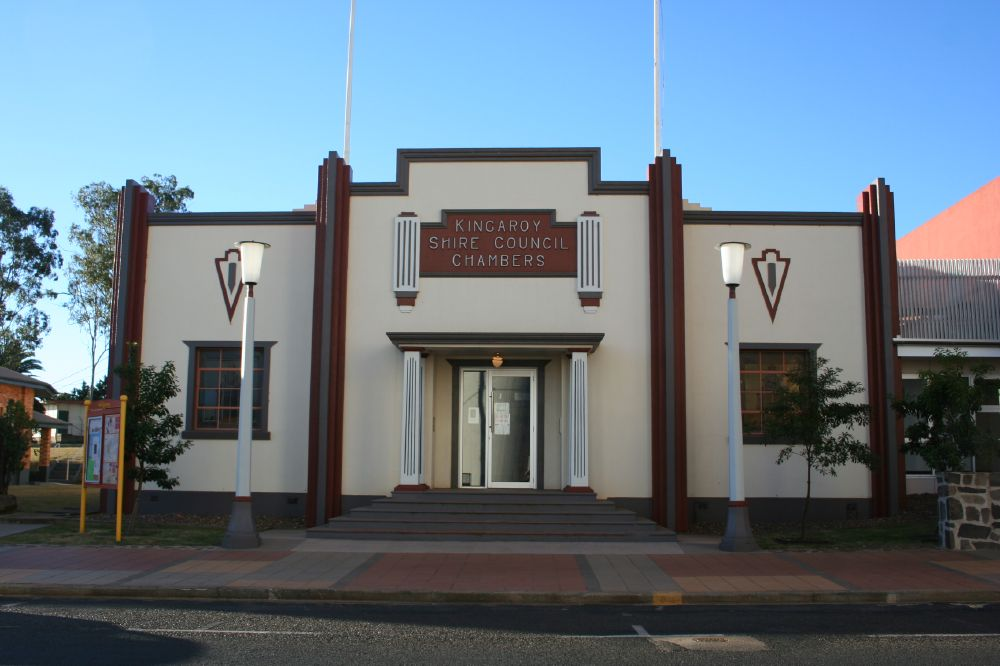
- Kingaroy Shire Council Chambers, 2008

- Location within Queensland Location within Australia
- 26.5393°S 151.8413°E
- Location: Haly Street, Kingaroy, South Burnett Region, Queensland, Australia

History
- Design period: 1919–1930s (interwar period)
- Built: 1938

Site notes
- Architect: Gerard William Barlow
- Architectural styles: Modernism, Art Deco

Queensland Heritage Register
- Official name: Kingaroy Shire Council Chambers (former)
- Type: state heritage (built)
- Designated: 9 November 2012
- Reference no.: 602810
- Significant period: Interwar
- Significant components: office/s, meeting house
- Builders: Kell & Rigby

Kingaroy Shire Council Chambers is a heritage-listed former town hall and now visitor information centre and art gallery at Haly Street, Kingaroy, South Burnett Region, Queensland, Australia. It was designed by Gerard William Barlow and built in 1938 by Kell & Rigby. It was added to the Queensland Heritage Register on 9 November 2012.

== History ==
Built in 1938, the Kingaroy Shire Chambers demonstrate the growth, prosperity and consolidation of Kingaroy as an important regional centre in the Wide Bay-Burnett.

The arrival of the Kilkivan branch railway to the "56 mile peg" in 1904 was the impetus for the establishment of the township of Kingaroy, as a rapid expansion of closer agricultural settlement occurred in the surrounding region. Town lots were auctioned in that year and public and commercial interests soon clustered around the railhead. Earlier settlements such as Booie (1882), Taabinga Village (1892) and Coolabunia (1879) could not compete with Kingaroy's proximity to the railway. By the time the railway extended to Nanango in 1911, the township was replacing its older counterparts as the dominant service centre for the South Burnett.

Initially, timber was the main product transported from Kingaroy railway station, with loggers capitalising on the abundant stands of hoop and bunya pine that existed in the softwood-vine forests of the region. Increasing land settlement saw large amounts of the existing scrub, eucalypt forests and brigalow cleared for agriculture, exposing a range of soil types, including the rich red soils, for which the region has since become known. By the 1910s, maize cultivation and dairy farming were replacing the timber industry as the key components of the local economy, while the region's peanut industry was in its nascent phase of development.

The Shire of Kingaroy was established in 1912 by excising former areas of the Nanango, Wambo and Weinholt Shires and later increased in size with the addition of land from Wondai Shire. Kingaroy's first council chambers, a modest timber structure was built in 1913, with the first council meeting held in the building in June of that year.

During the interwar period, a rapid expansion of agricultural activities occurred in the Kingaroy Shire. Dairying was the principal primary industry in the shire, with the Kingaroy Butter Factory one of the largest producers in the region, the outlet for the numerous dairy farms engaged in the production of cream. Kingaroy Shire was the centre for Queensland's burgeoning peanut industry, boasting over 550 growers and 11,500 acres (4,700 ha) under cultivation by 1928, with the town's first timber silos built in that year. The district was one of the state's most important for corn growing, with the Manneum Maize Company farm the largest of its type in Australia in 1927. As the surrounding area's service centre, Kingaroy benefited from this growth in primary industry.

By late 1937 the Kingaroy Shire Council had outgrown its small chambers. The four officers employed by the Shire were located in the chamber's small board room, and were forced to relocate to a shared counter during council meetings. Additionally, engine smoke from the adjacent power house periodically entered the shire chambers. In September 1937 a council meeting moved that a committee be instructed to proceed with the arrangements for the erection of new council chambers. To enable construction, vacant land adjacent to the existing chambers was purchased by the Council in mid-1938.

The construction of the new chambers in Kingaroy was part of a wider pattern of civic building that occurred in Queensland in the 1930s. This period saw the construction of numerous council chambers, town and shire halls, and other public buildings in settlements throughout the state. While some were Depression-era relief projects, others were built in the latter part of the decade, when economic conditions had improved. In the South Burnett, examples of this pattern included the Nanango Council Chambers (1934–35), (demolished), Murgon Civic Centre (1938) and the Wondai Shire Hall and Library (1938–39). The Queensland Government played an important role in facilitating many of these projects, by offering low interest loans and subsidised labour costs, as a way of generating employment. However, this process did not occur at Kingaroy. After adopting the decision to build new chambers, Kingaroy Shire Council applied for a loan of £5000 to fund the construction of the building. The council felt it was uneconomical to pursue the path of State assistance, as by this time, government subsidies only covered around a third of actual labour costs, while the interest rates of a shorter term government loan were thought to be too high.

Many shire chambers and town halls of the 1920s and 1930s are fine examples of the influence of modern architectural styles in Queensland townscapes. Incorporating elements of the jazz-influenced Art Deco and machine-age vision of the Moderne, these buildings were built as expressions of confidence in a bright and modern future. Stylistic elements of Art Deco and Moderne include decorative treatments like geometrical motifs, decorative vertical banding and a streamlining of the building form. These features are evident in many prominent civic buildings throughout the state including the Goondiwindi Civic Centre and the Southport Town Hall.

Initial plans were prepared for the building by local builder Mr C Gill, who later collaborated with council engineer GW Barlow in the final design of the building. The construction of the chambers was undertaken by Sydney building firm Kell & Rigby of Sydney, Brisbane and Toowoomba. Established in 1910, Kell & Rigby's work in Queensland during the 1930s included Toowoomba's Empire Theatre, Stanthorpe Hospital and the Masel residence. The 1913 council chambers were relocated from their position between the new chambers and the powerhouse, to face the street directly behind.

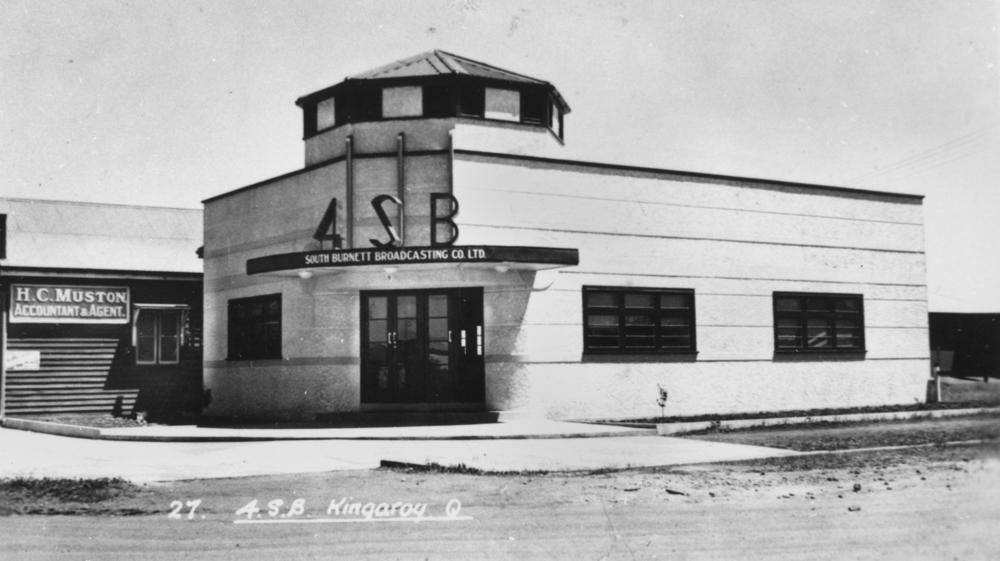
Kingaroy radio station, 4SB, circa 1938

The building of the Kingaroy Council Chambers coincided with a number of major projects in the Shire that collectively reflected the progress and confidence of the district. During 1938, the South Burnett's first radio station 4SB, opened its studio in the township and construction began on a new Kingaroy Hospital, regarded at the time as Queensland's most "modern". A new district office was established by the Queensland Department of Agriculture and Stock, an acknowledgment of the area's importance for primary production. The Peanut Marketing Board significantly expanded their operations by erecting large concrete silos (the Kingaroy Peanut Silos) on their processing site opposite the shire chambers. Kell & Rigby also constructed the silos, completing both the silos and shire chambers within a short time of each other.

The Kingaroy Shire Chambers were officially opened on 1 December 1938 by the Minister for Agriculture and Stock, Frank Bulcock. Prior to the ceremony at the chambers, Bulcock officially opened the new silos. Conducting both of these ceremonies on the same day symbolically expressed the Shire's confidence and its progress since formation, while acknowledging its dependence on agriculture to deliver its future prosperity.

The new chambers were a single storey building of brick and concrete. Silky oak timber was used extensively throughout the interior for the fittings, doors and furniture, the work of RV Rogerson's local joinery firm. Ornate plaster work adorned the ceilings while leadlight windows incorporating the Shire's logo were included in the main elevation. A detached toilet block was constructed at the rear of the building.

A description written at the time of opening outlined the internal arrangement of space and features of the new chambers. The front central space, featuring a crow's ash and ironbark timber floor, contained the public office for business and other transactions, incorporating the strong room. The left hand side of the building contained the health inspector and engineer's offices and records room, while the right side provided rooms for the accounting office, clerks and shire chairman.

The centrepiece of the new chambers was the boardroom at the rear of the building. The room was panelled in silky oak, with parquetry floors of tulip and rose gum timber. A dais with seating for the shire chairman and clerk overlooked a U-shaped table for twelve councillors, furnished with drawers and swivel oak chairs, and oak seating was provided for the public gallery.

The Kingaroy Shire Council continued to operate from the chambers for over forty years. In 1979, new administrative offices for the council were built alongside the Kingaroy Civic Centre, as envisioned in architect Karl Langer's original plan of the complex. In December 1983, the former chambers were officially reopened by local state member and Queensland Premier Sir Joh Bjelke-Petersen, as the Kingaroy District Development Board Tourist Information Centre.

== Kingaroy Art Gallery ==
The former Kingaroy Shire Chambers is currently the Kingaroy Art Gallery, a component of the Kingaroy Visitor Information Centre, which opened in 2005. The gallery hosts monthly exhibitions by local and visiting artists in three gallery spaces, often including a themed exhibition from the South Burnett Regional Council’s art collection. It also features a shop for regional art and high end craft.

As part of this complex, a new building was built between the chambers and the former power house (Kingaroy Heritage Museum). To provide a connection to the new building, part of the chamber's right wall was removed. The vestibule screen and original counter of the chambers had previously been moved to the museum building when it was operating as the art gallery. Despite these alterations, much of the Kingaroy Shire Chambers, especially its meeting room, remains highly intact.

In 2008, Kingaroy Shire was amalgamated with Wondai, Murgon and Nanango Shires to form the South Burnett Region.

== Description ==
The Kingaroy Council Chambers, a single storey masonry building with Art Deco decorative features, is located on Haly Street directly opposite Kingaroy's towering peanut silos. In 2012 it forms part of the Kingaroy Visitor Information Centre and is linked to the former power house (now the Kingaroy Heritage Museum) via a connecting building to the east. Its decorative Art Deco styling with vertical banding, geometric motifs and stepped parapet gives the building a strong streetscape presence.

The front elevation is symmetrical about a central entrance and has a stepped parapet finished with a decorative moulding. The facade, finished with a smooth cement render, is divided into three bays by projecting pilasters with vertical banding. The central entrance way is flanked by single rectangular windows with concrete-formed architraves. The windows are metal-framed with multi-paned leadlight glazing incorporating the Kingaroy Shire's original logo and a pivoting central window panel. Large decorative diamond-shaped motifs are above the windows. The entrance way is sheltered by a horizontal, concrete awning with a moulded profile and supported on tapered masonry columns with a decorative vertical banding pattern. The entrance door is recent and is accessed via splayed concrete steps. Lettering "KINGAROY SHIRE COUNCIL CHAMBERS" is above the entrance and is framed with a simple decorative moulding and flanked by two stylised classical columns with fluting protruding from the facade. Flag poles rise from the roof behind the parapet.

The west elevation is a rendered masonry wall with little decoration. It consists of a central service door flanked on each side by two windows. Decorative treatments similar to the front elevation are used including the moulded capping to the wall and around the window frames. Small hooded vents are set into the wall above each of the windows.

The building's hipped roof is hidden behind parapets on all but the rear elevation and overhangs by approximately 40 centimetres (16 in). The roof is clad with red corrugated metal sheeting. Gutters are quad profile and soffits are lined with timber battens. Window and door treatments on the rear elevation are similar to the western and front elevations. The eastern elevation is mostly concealed by an adjoining building. A parapet wall with a single multi-paned window is visible.

Inside, the Council Chambers comprises a large open space (formerly the public office) at the front of the building incorporating a former strong room and the meeting room at the rear of the building. Hallways run down each side of these two large rooms providing access to several (former) offices.

The front central space, formerly the public office, features a crow's ash and ironbark timber floor forming a striped pattern. Walls are finished with hard-set plaster. Ceilings are also finished with plaster and are adorned with ornate plaster cornices and panels featuring geometric designs. Multi-paned skylights with coloured glass have been inserted where early pendant lights remain. Skirting boards and architraves are varnished silky oak. Several internal windows and openings are located in this room. One is a timber framed opening to the teller's booth set into the wall and features a metal grille. Others are leadlight glazing.

The meeting room at the rear of the building features walls panelled in silky oak and floors finished with tulip and rose gum parquetry. A dais (seating the shire chairman and clerk) overlooks a solid U-shaped table furnished with drawers and accommodating 12 chairs including six swivel oak chairs. Silky oak public seating and timber screen are also located in the room. A vertical map cabinet is built into the wall panel on the west wall. Ceilings are formed from plaster and are raked near the wall junctions which are finished with a decorative plaster cornice. A central plaster panel adorns the ceiling from which early pendant lights are hung. Panelled doors, architraves and skirtings are silky oak. All timberwork including the furniture is similarly detailed.

Offices are more simply detailed with plaster cornices and some feature decorative plaster ceiling panels. All rooms have silky oak architraves, panelled doors and skirtings. Floors are lined with hardwood boards though some have been covered with carpet. Some pendant lights remain but some have been replaced with recent fittings.

The strong room is formed with thick masonry walls finished with plaster and has a solid metal door featuring brass door hardware. A small brass plaque with the words Ajax Manufacturing Co. is fixed to the door. Some early shelving remains together with an early timber rolling ladder.

Entry into the adjacent museum is via a recent covered area accessed through a new opening formed in the eastern wall of the chambers building.

Plantings in garden beds around the building are not considered to be of heritage significance.

== Heritage listing ==
The former Kingaroy Shire Council Chambers was listed on the Queensland Heritage Register on 9 November 2012 having satisfied the following criteria.

The place is important in demonstrating the evolution or pattern of Queensland's history.

The Kingaroy Shire Council Chambers are important in demonstrating the growth, prosperity and consolidation of Kingaroy as an important regional centre in the Wide Bay-Burnett. It illustrates the pattern that occurred in Queensland after towns on branch railways developed as service centres for regions transformed by the interconnected processes of government-initiated closer settlement and increased primary production. Built and opened in 1938, the Shire Chambers are a tangible expression of a pronounced period of prosperity in the township, resulting from the rapid expansion of dairying, peanut production and other agricultural activities in the surrounding region.

The Kingaroy Shire Council Chambers are important in demonstrating the widespread pattern in Queensland of expressing civic pride through building council chambers and town halls during the 1930s. Many of these buildings, including the Kingaroy Shire Chambers, are important in demonstrating the influence and spread of modern architectural styles in Queensland townscapes during the interwar period, illustrated by its use of decorative vertical banding and geometrical motifs.

The place is important in demonstrating the principal characteristics of a particular class of cultural places.

The Kingaroy Shire Chambers are important in demonstrating the principal characteristics of shire council chambers. The building is prominently positioned on a principal thoroughfare of the township. Internally, the place features a front central space for public transactions, flanked by a small number of rooms, with the rear of the building housing the highly intact and finely crafted meeting room and record storage area. This spatial arrangement illustrates the requirements that facilitated the day-to-day operations of a shire council. Finely crafted interior joinery remains intact including the meeting room's table and chairs, dais, public seating and map cabinet.

Externally, the building's vertical banding and geometric motifs on its main elevation demonstrates the use of such architectural elements in Queensland shire chambers and town halls of the 1930s.

The place is important because of its aesthetic significance.

The Kingaroy Shire Council Chambers is important because of its aesthetic significance. It is a modest but elegant and well-proportioned building. These qualities are in contrast to its setting with the monumental peanut silos opposite forming a dramatic counterpoint.

The building's prominent position on a principal thoroughfare of the township expresses the centrality and importance of local government to the community, while its design expresses civic pride and the confidence of Kingaroy Shire at the time of construction.

The Kingaroy Shire Council Chambers contains many finely crafted elements and timber joinery including walls paneled in silky oak and floors finished with tulip and rose gum parquetry, dais, meeting table, swivel oak meeting chairs and public seating and map cabinet.
