= Murgon Civic Centre =

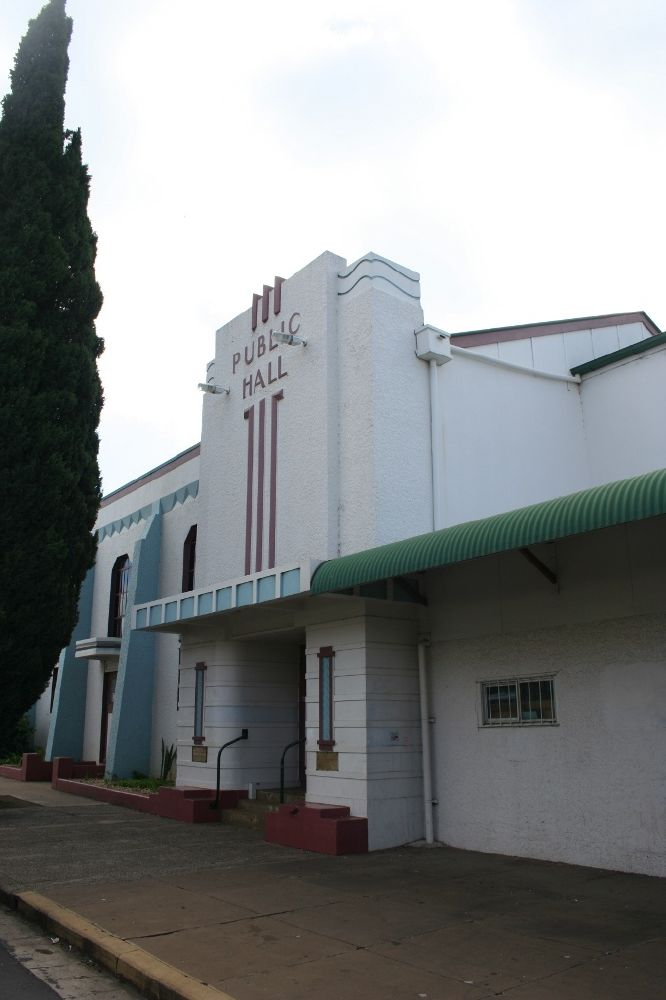
- Murgon Civic Centre, 2008

- Location within Queensland Location within Australia
- 26.2417°S 151.942°E
- Location: 62–70 Lamb Street, Murgon, South Burnett Region, Queensland, Australia

History
- Design period: 1919–1930s (interwar period)
- Built: 1938

Site notes
- Architect: Clifford Ernest Plant
- Architectural style: Art Deco

Queensland Heritage Register
- Official name: Murgon Civic Centre, Murgon Public Hall
- Type: state heritage (built)
- Designated: 9 November 2012
- Reference no.: 602812
- Significant period: 1938–
- Builders: HG Neilsen

Murgon Civic Centre is a heritage-listed town hall at 62–70 Lamb Street, Murgon, South Burnett Region, Queensland, Australia. It is also known as Murgon Public Hall. It was designed by Clifford Ernest Plant and built in 1938 by HG Neilsen. It was added to the Queensland Heritage Register on 9 November 2012.

== History ==
The Murgon Civic Centre, located on the corner of Murgon's principal intersection, Lamb and Gore Streets, was built in 1938 - a period of civic pride expressed in the building of town halls and council chambers throughout Queensland - to serve this important South Burnett town. Designed by Brisbane architect Clifford Ernest Plant, the Murgon Civic Centre was constructed by Maryborough builder HG Neilsen. Comprising a hall, former library, four shops and a corner clock tower, this Art Deco complex makes a major contribution to the streetscape of Murgon.

The town of Murgon grew around the location of an unattended siding on the railway line from Kilkivan, which opened on 14 September 1903. The railway was the crucial causal factor in the vast influx of selectors who took up land excised from Barambah Station in 1902 and again in 1913 and provided the stimulus for the development of Murgon as a service centre. The railway facilitated selectors sending their produce — maize and pumpkins, pigs, cattle and dairy products — to markets.

Within the first decade of the town's existence two hotels opened, various stores operated, a combined newsagent, tobacconist and barber's shop opened, a Methodist Church was completed and Murphy's Hall was hosting meetings of the Salvation Army and other religious groups. Murgon's butter factory opened in 1913.

Further stimuli to Murgon's development were the creation of the Shire of Murgon and the construction of two branch lines from Murgon to Proston and to Windera. The new shire was formed from parts of Weinholt and Kilkivan Shires on 16 January 1914, with Murgon as its administrative centre. The Murgon Shire Chambers were located in Macalister Street by 1919. The two branch rail lines were completed in February 1923 and in March 1925 respectively, making Murgon an important railway junction.

By the mid- to late-1930s Murgon was rapidly expanding as a service centre for its surrounding agricultural community. The Shire of Murgon, covered 271 square miles and had a total population of 4000. Major improvements to the town of Murgon during the decade from 1928 to 1938 amounted to £255,000. In 1938 dairying in the Burnett district was burgeoning, having the second largest number of dairy herds and of dairy cows in Queensland after Moreton district. By 1941 Murgon was the second largest centre in the South Burnett with a population of 1091; after Kingaroy, the largest town with 2300 persons.

By 1938 plans for the construction of a civic centre at a cost of £10,500 were underway. Tenders were called by the architect, CE Plant, in September 1937 and closed in January 1938. HG Neilsen's tender was accepted. Building took place during 1938 and the Murgon Town Hall was officially opened on 16 December 1938 by the Minister for Agriculture, Frank Bulcock. The opening was celebrated with a ball and supper to which all residents of the shire were invited. The building incorporated a main auditorium, library, reading room, and Returned Soldiers' League room along Gore Street, a corner clock tower, and five shops facing Lamb Street. Part of the building was situated on the site of the original School of Arts building and several shops. These were removed to the show grounds and redeveloped under the supervision of CE Plant. The new town hall took over many of the functions of the old School of Arts.

Town halls of varying design and dimension are landmarks of Australia's cities and suburbs, shires and towns. They have been important as social venues and focal points for their communities and also for the administration of local government. However, it is from an architectural viewpoint that they are probably best remembered.

Numerous town halls were constructed across Australia during the second half of the 1930s as an expression of civic pride when the economy was once again on a more secure foundation after the Great Depression. During the late 1930s many Queensland country towns were engaged in erecting or remodelling civic buildings. More than 20 centres built new shire and council buildings while shire halls at Wambo, Boulia, Woongarra, Gympie, Cunnamulla and Aramac were remodelled. Within the last two years of the 1930s, more than £177,000 was spent on new shire and council halls and nearly £20,000 was outlaid on alterations to existing buildings. This building programme was encouraged by the Queensland Government through subsidies to councils.

In Queensland the design of these town halls spanned the spectrum from strict axial classicism (Childers) to Goondiwindi Civic Centre's highly personal and rich Art Deco-inspired style. Typical was the vertically or striated masonry facade, found for example in the Johnstone Shire Hall at Innisfail (1938) and in the Rockhampton Town Hall (1941); both of which were substantial buildings serving prosperous centres of primary industry. According to architect Ian Sinnamon, author of Putting on a brave front: Queensland between the wars, the Murgon Civic Centre, though more humble in size and resources, is a virtuoso piece of its kind. It and the Johnstone Shire Hall are the only known 1930s Art Deco reinforced concrete municipal buildings of this style and scale in Queensland.

The Murgon Civic Centre is one of the interwar shire chambers and town halls that are fine examples of the influence of modern architectural styles in Queensland townscapes. Incorporating elements of the jazz-influenced Art Deco and the machine-age vision of the Moderne, these buildings were built as expressions of confidence in a bright and modern future. Stylistic elements of Art Deco and the Moderne include decorative treatments like geometrical motifs, decorative vertical banding and a streamlining of the building form. These features are evident in many prominent civic buildings throughout the State including the Kingaroy Shire Council Chambers, Goondiwindi Civic Centre, Southport Town Hall and Gayndah Shire Hall.

Architect CE Plant, designed a number of public buildings in south- east Queensland during the 1930s. These include the Kings Beach Bathing Pavilion at Caloundra, Dalby swimming pool, five bathing pavilions on the Redcliffe peninsula and the Sandgate Bathing Pavilion (demolished). Born in Cheadle, England in 1885 Plant was articled as a pupil and then architect's assistant in England from 1902. He was employed by the Queensland Government in the Department of Railways as a draftsman 1911–14; was employed as an instructor by the Brisbane Central Technical College; served during World War I (1915–20) before returning to the Central Technical College and working for the Department of Railways during the 1920s. Plant became registered as an architect in Queensland from 1929. His architectural practice however, dated from October 1926 and in the following year he designed premises in Adelaide Street, Brisbane for auctioneers Blocksidge and Ferguson. He produced many residences in Brisbane during the 1920s and 1930s, some influenced by the Spanish Mission style, while other works explored contemporary architectural styles such as the Moderne and neo-Georgian.

The exterior of the Murgon Civic Centre is quite intact, although some alterations have been made and the complex has been repainted.

The Library building has had a number of functions since 1938. It housed some high school classes before the Murgon State High School was built in 1945 and acted as temporary shire council offices c. 1952 to 1964 until the Shire Council Offices were erected diagonally opposite on Gore Street in the early 1960s. After the building's completion the library transferred there from the Murgon Civic Centre. Currently, the former library is used as office space. Its asbestos roof was replaced with corrugated metal sheeting after 1995.

The town hall continues to be used for its original purpose. Internal alterations to the hall were made in 1972 by Stuart Reed and Associates. Air conditioning, sound proofing and new electrical systems have been added. New changing rooms and a new loading dock were added to the northern end. On either side of the stage, new walls and new openings were added and partitions were removed, altering access to the wings. The kitchen has been refitted.

Of the five shops, only the two occupied by the Commonwealth Bank have been substantially altered internally. The shops' original flat awning with signage along the street frontage has been replaced with a convex sheet metal awning.

== Description ==
The Murgon Civic Centre is located on the corner of Murgon's main intersection and comprises a public hall, former library (now offices) and four shops. A central clock tower gives the building prominence in the streetscape and acts as a pivotal point with shops extending from it to south-west along Lamb Street and with the public hall and library extending from it along Gore Street to the north-west. The Murgon Civic Centre is a stately building with a strong presence in Murgon, forming part of the Murgon shopping precinct, and at the rear is bordered by the railway lines to Kilkivan and Proston.

The Civic Centre has Art Deco design features including a streamlined appearance, horizontal and vertical banding, simple geometric decoration and three-dimensional massing which emphasise important elements such as entrance ways. The street-facing elevations have stepped parapets and are finished in roughcast cement render with decorative elements accentuated with contrasting paint colours.

=== Public Hall ===
The public hall is a double height space with a rectangular footprint. It comprises an auditorium, mezzanine and supper room. The main elevation is symmetrical and links to the former library via a low screen wall. It is constructed with a masonry frame and is finished with a roughcast cement render. A stepped parapet with geometric banding partly conceals a gabled roof which covers the auditorium space and is clad in painted corrugated metal sheeting.

Each end of the main elevation is emphasised with a projecting tower. The northernmost tower accommodates the auditorium entrance which has recessed double doors sheltered by a cantilevered masonry awning with decorative edging. The entrance porch is accessed via a short flight of stairs framed by wide columns with decorative horizontal banding. Plaques commemorating the opening of the building have been fixed to the columns below a chevron motif. Vertical banding rises above the awning to stylised lettering forming the words "PUBLIC HALL". The northernmost tower reads as another entrance mirroring the form of the southern end but is in-filled with a multi-paned window above a solid base decorated with a three-dimensional chevron motif. Vertical banding rises above a second-level angled metal-framed window. The parapet of each tower is decorated with parallel sweeping curves.

Tall masonry buttresses formed by the building's concrete frame punctuate the elevation between the towers and frame tall metal-framed windows with truncated tops. Transoms decorated with horizontal banding divide each of the window bays. Two secondary entrances are sheltered by smaller cantilevered awnings. The hall is set on a solid masonry plinth and is separated from the footpath by a low garden bed. Metal rain-heads drain from gutters concealed behind the parapet.

A supper room is located at the rear of the building and is a long lean-to structure attached to the auditorium. It has a corrugated metal roof and is clad with weatherboards. It is punctuated with simple timber-framed casement windows. Gable ends of the main building are clad in fibrous cement sheeting. Recent single level change rooms, a loading dock and a small kitchen extension have been added to the library end of the building. These are not considered to be of cultural heritage significance.

Internally the building comprises a foyer space with a mezzanine level above (seating 100 people), an auditorium (seating 300 people) and a stage located at the library end. The auditorium is a wide space with a flat, recently installed, acoustic panelled ceiling with recessed lighting. Walls, finished with hardset plaster, are punctuated by the street-facing windows. These are mirrored on the opposite wall, which separates the auditorium from the supper room, by openings filled with timber screening forming a chevron pattern. The stage is simply detailed and lined with fibrous cement sheeting and accessed via double steel-framed steps. The mezzanine level is accessed via simple timber-framed, enclosed-riser stairs. It has little decoration and is furnished with early fixed seating. The foyer space is simply detailed with a flat ceiling lined with fibrous cement joined with timber cover strips. It contains a small box office and double doors provide access into the auditorium.

The supper room is a lofty space with exposed roof framing consisting of triangular timber trusses supported on the auditorium's concrete frame and bracketed off the external wall. Walls and raked ceilings are lined with fibrous cement sheeting joined with timber cover strips.

Floors throughout the public hall are lined with clear-finished hardwood tongue and grove boards.

=== Former Library ===
The former Library building is a timber-framed building of a more domestic scale with a stepped parapet masonry facade. It is low-set with a hipped roof clad with painted corrugated metal sheeting. The roof is partly concealed by the parapet wall which is finished with rough-cast cement render. The parapet is simply decorated with horizontal banding. A curved cantilevered street awning supported on a steel frame shelters a centrally-placed entrance door with timber- framed casements on either side. A curved garden bed separates the building from the footpath. Other elevations are plain with walls clad in fibrous cement sheeting.

Internally the building comprises several office spaces. Walls and ceilings are lined with fibrous cement sheeting joined with cover strips and floors are lined with carpet. Internal doors are panelled timber. Cornices and picture rails are simply detailed and formed from timber.

=== Shops ===
Four shops run along Lamb Street with the clock tower located above the corner shop. The shops are timber framed with masonry external walls which form a parapet to the roof behind. A recent curved street awning supported on steel posts has been installed. The roof slopes away from the street to the north-east and is clad with corrugated metal sheeting. The clock tower mirrors the design of the public hall entrance projections with vertical banding rising to the clock face. The clock face is square and is flush with the facade.

The two central shops retain some original shopfront glazing. Central, recessed timber-panelled shop doors with multi-paned glass remain to these shops. They are framed by sheet glass shop windows with multi-paned horizontal glazing above. Internally ceilings and walls are unchanged and lined with fibrous cement sheeting joined with timber cover strips. Floors are lined with vinyl sheeting.

The corner shop is covered with advertising or in-filled with sheeting and access into the shop is via a metal roller-door. Sheet glass remains either side of the entrance. The fourth shop space has been substantially altered in accordance with the needs of a modern banking facility and an ATM has been installed into the front wall. Early awning windows punctuate the south-east elevation.

On Gore Street a large conifer shields the building (not considered to be of cultural heritage significance) and a low concrete-formed garden bed filled with flowering shrubs separates the public hall and the library building from the footpath. A loading dock and bitumened service road accesses the complex adjacent to the library building and leads to a bitumened carpark at the rear of the supper hall.

The building overlooks the Royal Hotel on the opposite side of Gore Street and the Murgon War Memorial to the south.

== Heritage listing ==
Murgon Civic Centre was listed on the Queensland Heritage Register on 9 November 2012 having satisfied the following criteria.

The place is important in demonstrating the evolution or pattern of Queensland's history.

Murgon Civic Centre (1938) is the result of the growth of Murgon as a major service town in the South Burnett region in the inter-war period. It is important in demonstrating the development of agricultural settlements and establishment of their service towns in rural Queensland up to World War II through the Queensland government's policy of closer settlement of the land facilitated by branch railway lines.

The Murgon Civic Centre is also important in demonstrating the widespread pattern in Queensland of expressing civic pride through building council chambers and town halls during the 1930s. While some were Depression-era relief projects, others, such as Murgon Civic Centre, were built in the latter part of the decade, when economic conditions had improved and expectations for a prosperous future were high.

The place is important in demonstrating the principal characteristics of a particular class of cultural places.

The Murgon Civic Centre is a representative and intact example of a regional Art Deco and Moderne-inspired civic centre. It is one of a group of town and shire halls built throughout Queensland in the 1930s in response to improved economic times post-Depression.

The Murgon complex displays the principal features of these civic buildings, combining a public hall, library (now offices) shops and a clock tower. Like other town hall complexes, it is the focal point of the community and is located near the centre of the town on the corner of Murgon's principal streets.

The place is important because of its aesthetic significance.

The Murgon Civic Centre is important for its contribution to the townscape of Murgon. Situated at the principal intersection the clock tower is designed to address the corner and ensure the complex's prominence in the streetscape. The Art Deco influences - linear form, stepped skylines, chevron motifs and decorative horizontal banding - enhance the aesthetic appeal of the complex.
