= Mount Clara smelter =

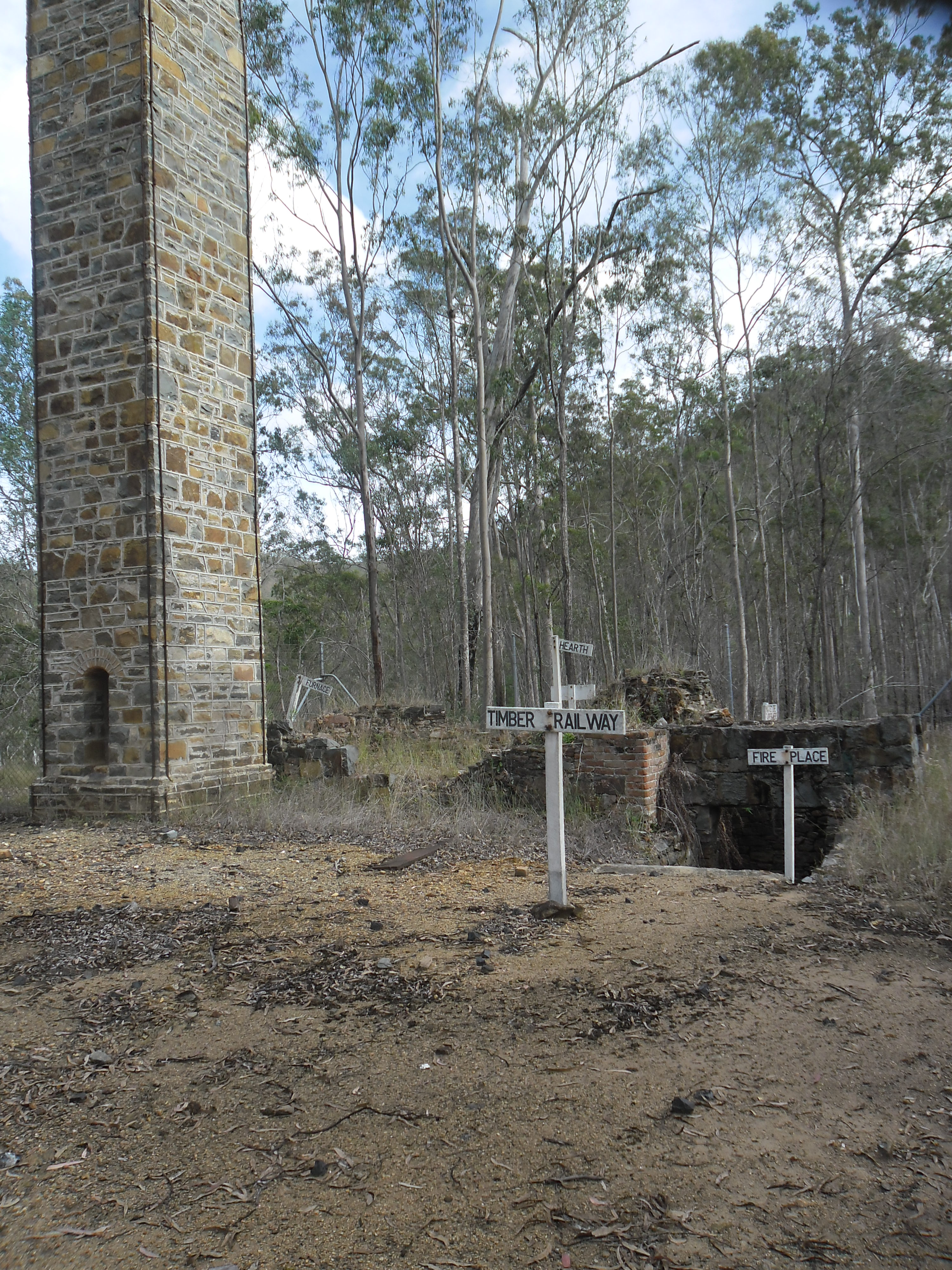
- Mount Clara smelter and chimney, taken in 2009. Modern tourist signs indicate from left to right, Furnace, Timber Railway, Fireplace. At the centre rear is the hearth

- Location within Queensland
- 26.1782°S 152.2726°E
- Location: Rossmore Road, Oakview, Gympie Region, Queensland, Australia

History
- Design period: 1870s–1890s (late 19th century)
- Built: 1873

Queensland Heritage Register
- Official name: Mount Clara Smelter
- Type: state heritage (archaeological)
- Designated: 21 October 1992
- Reference no.: 600640
- Significant period: 1873 (fabric); 1873–1875 (historical)
- Significant components: chimney/chimney stack, slag pile/slag heap, fire box

Mount Clara smelter is a heritage-listed former copper smelter at Rossmore Road, in the upper reaches of Fat Hen Creek, Oakview (near Kilkivan), Gympie Region, Queensland, Australia. It was built in 1873. It was added to the Queensland Heritage Register on 21 October 1992.

Most of the operation is now in ruins, and the chimney is the only remaining intact part of a once active copper mine.

== History ==
During the copper boom of the 1860s – mid-1870s the price of copper was as much as UK £95 per ton. Copper mining probably commenced in the Mount Clara – Mount Coora area in 1872. The Mount Clara smelter was built in 1873. The smelter was built with local rock, and sand from Fraser Island.

The Mount Clara smelter was among the earliest built in Queensland, being built after Peak Downs, Mount Perry and Flanagans smelters, but a year before those at Mount Coora, Blackall Mine and the Adolphus William.

An 1872 report states that 8 long tons (8.1 t) of copper had been produced from 60 long tons (61 t) of ore, giving a return of 13 percent copper/ore. Slag from the operation was drained off in to the creek and large clumps are still visible.

The ore was a rich blue-green carbonate, sourced from a 10-foot (3.0 m) thick solid bed, yielding well over 100 metric tons (98 long tons; 110 short tons). It was fortuitous that carbonate ores are well suited to the reverberatory furnace method used at this site.

The smelter was reported to run continuously and satisfactorily. During operation it was required to have three shifts of six men working on the furnace as well as around 300 men working in the mines in the area. It is believed that between 10,000 and 12,000 people lived in the area at the time. The main mine was about 1 mile (1.6 km) away, around 560 feet (170 m) higher.

The smelter only operated until 1875 when it was closed, and the Mount Clara copper ore was subsequently carted to the Mount Coora smelter for treatment, following the purchase of the Mount Clara holdings by the Mount Coora Copper Mining Company in 1874. This may have been due to the fact that Mount Clara mine was two miles from the smelter, and ore had to be carted a considerable distance anyway. Mount Coora later had an ore roasting furnace built as well.

The Mount Clara smelter fell into neglect. All mining in the area ceased by 1886. At the time seven other similar smelters were functioning in the area, however these are no longer to be seen.

The eventual closure of the mines was attributed by Rands (in 1886) to the high cost of fuel for the smelters.

=== Conservation and tourism ===
Kilkivan Shire Council, with the help of a grant from the National Trust, undertook work to restore the historic Mount Clara Copper Smelter. The chimney was completely restored along with safety fencing, and the unpaved road was also made safer for travel. Mount Clara Chimney was registered with the National Trust of Queensland, and is on the Queensland Heritage Register.

The chimney is now a key tourist attraction in the Kilkivan area. It is located 3 kilometres (1.9 mi) off Rossmore Road, 13 kilometres (8.1 mi) by road out of town. The National Estate citation notes that "The site is notable for the absence of modern intrusions and as a relic of early mining activity in the area."

== Description ==
The smelter remains which were renovated by Kilkivan Shire Council in 1978, are exposed to ground level. The smelter is made of brick and stone, the walls standing to a height of 170 centimetres (67 in) at the fire-box end, and to 120 centimetres (47 in) height at the opposite end of the smelter. These heights seem to correlate with the spring-level of the now collapsed arched roof. The internal ovoid form of the reverberatory smelter can be readily seen. The fire-box is particularly well preserved and has a deep below-ground access. Iron staples are inserted into the base plinth of the smelter at regular intervals and seem to be the support points for the rail reinforcing bars which would have originally bound the smelter.

The slag heap is small (22 by 11 metres (72 ft × 36 ft)) and contains large square sand mould slag blocks, each about 80 by 40 by 15 centimetres (31.5 in × 15.7 in × 5.9 in).

West of the smelter is an area of brick rubble and vitrified brick. This seems to be the dump spot where rubble removed from the smelter in 1978 was tipped. A chain wire fence was placed around the smelter and chimney in 1978 which prevents close access to the remains.

=== The chimney ===
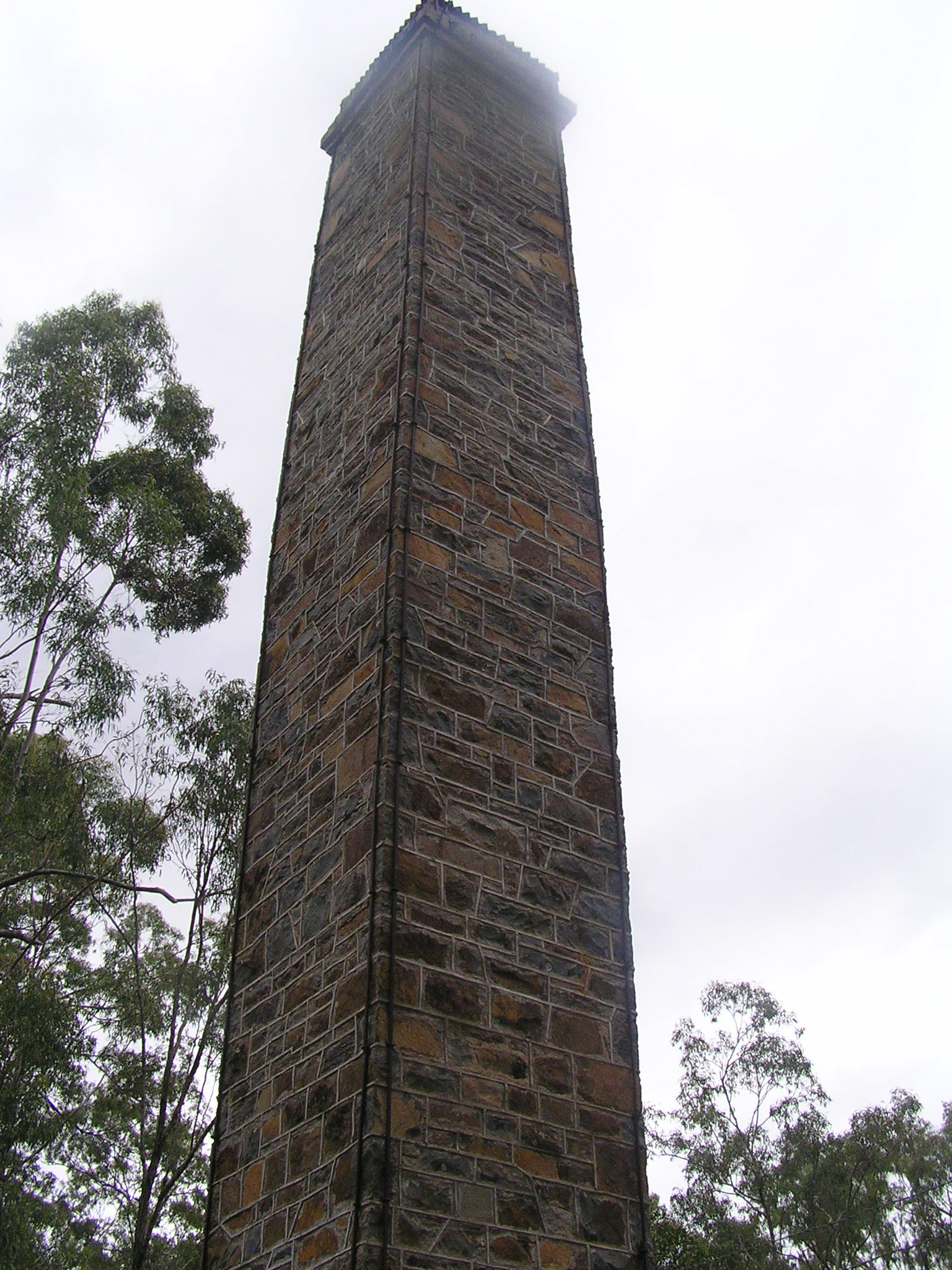
Mount Clara Chimney

The chimney is thought to be the oldest surviving mining industry chimney in Queensland, also being among the first built. It stands about 13.8 metres (45 ft) high, although early descriptions reported a height of 66 feet (20 m). It was constructed from local bluestone, clamped with iron, and held together with a lime and sand mortar. Firebricks lining the furnace and chimney were made from good quality local fireclay.

The chimney stands close to the smelter and the entry point of the smelter flue, now collapsed, can be clearly seen at about 180 centimetres (71 in) up the western face of the chimney.

=== The mine ===
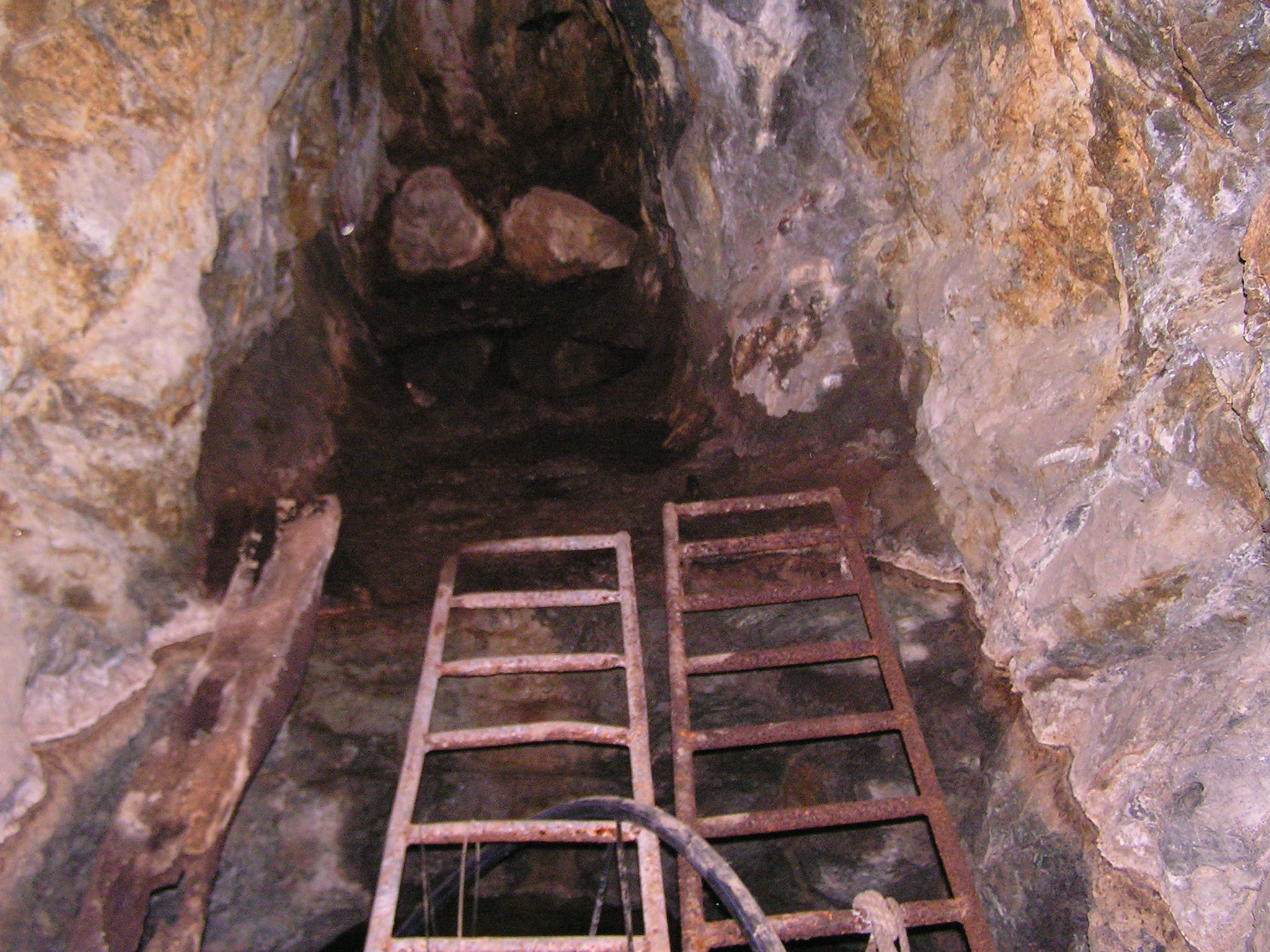
Interior photo of a level mine shaft. The modern ladders are covering a vertical shaft.

The ore from the mine was taken from a shaft dug into the mountain approximately 1 mile (1.6 km) away. The mine has an arched roof and no uprights, and is believed to mimic the style used by miners from Cornwall.

The mine entrance was rediscovered and opened in the 1980s and some more exploratory work was done intermittently over the next several years, although no commercial operations ever took place. It has since been resealed for safety.

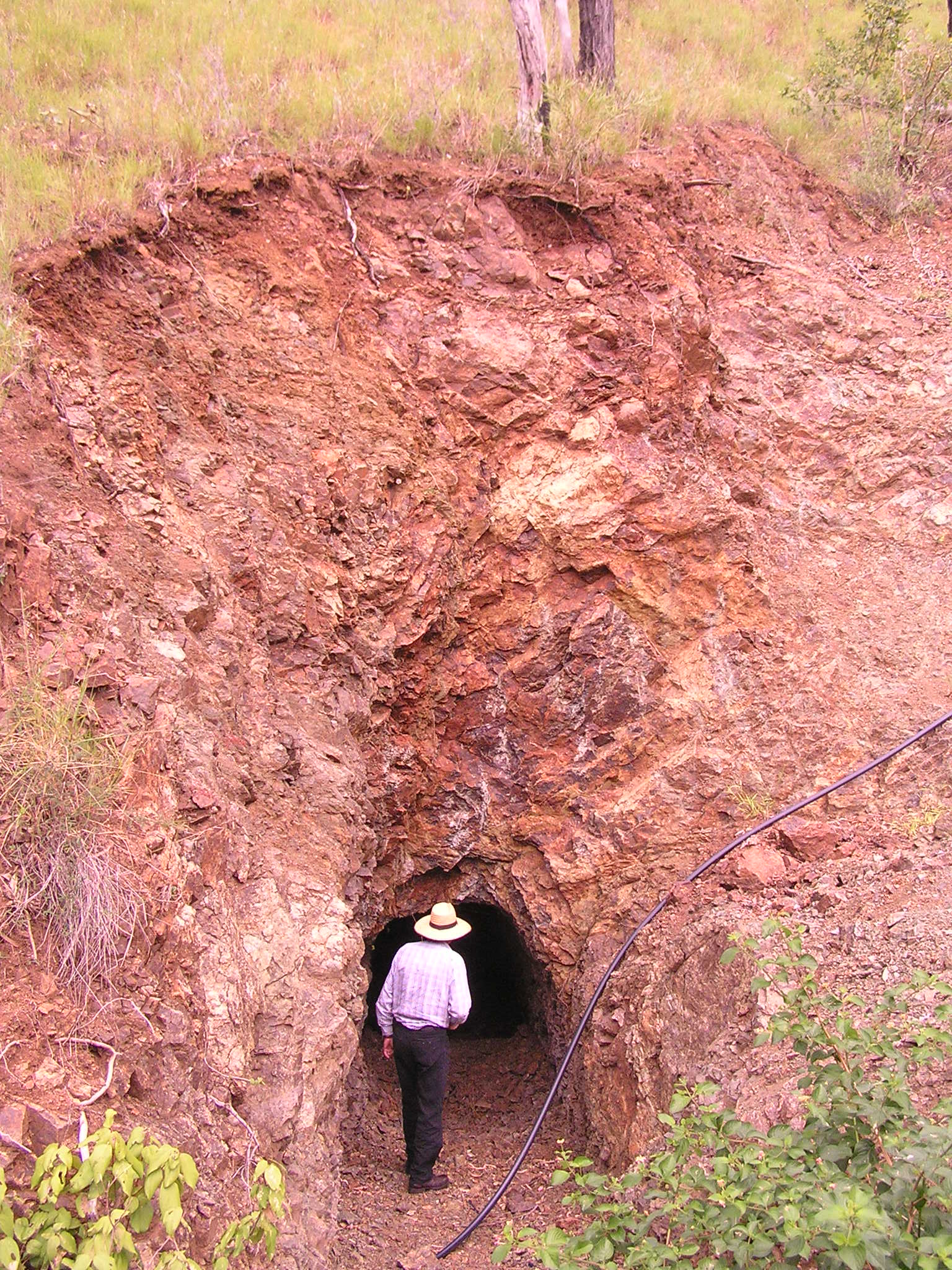
The re-opened entrance to the Mt Clara mine. 2009 photo. The site has since been sealed up.

The mine itself is situated on private property and is not included in the heritage register boundary.

== Heritage listing ==
Mount Clara smelter was listed on the Queensland Heritage Register on 21 October 1992 having satisfied the following criteria.

The place is important in demonstrating the evolution or pattern of Queensland's history.

Together with the small number of well-preserved 1870s smelters (Flanagans, Adolphus William) the Mount Clara smelter is important in demonstrating the evolution of base metal mining in Queensland.

The place demonstrates rare, uncommon or endangered aspects of Queensland's cultural heritage.

Smelters of this age and good state of preservation are rare aspects of Queensland's history. The smelter chimney is perhaps the oldest surviving mining industry chimney in Queensland.

The place has potential to yield information that will contribute to an understanding of Queensland's history.

The site may also contain evidence that provides information contributing to the understanding of that period and of early mining in the Maryborough district.

== See also ==
- Mining in Australia
