= St Michael and All Angels Church, Kingaroy =

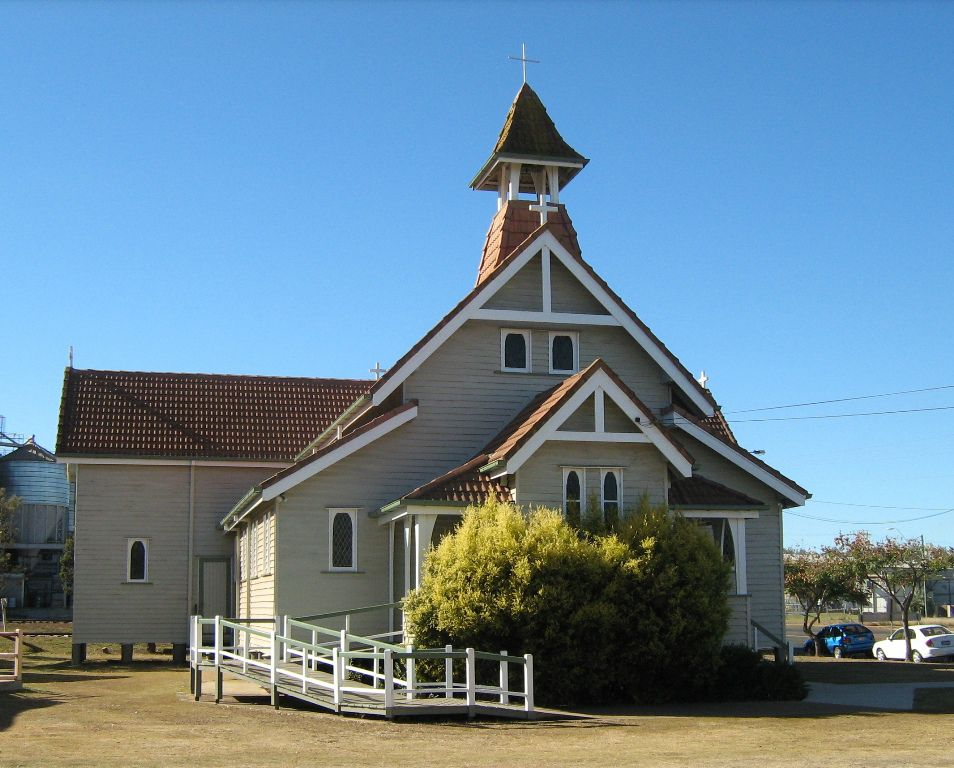
- St Michael and All Angels Church, 2008

- Location within Queensland Location within Australia
- 26.541°S 151.8407°E
- Location: 2–6 Alford Street, Kingaroy, South Burnett Region, Queensland, Australia

History
- Design period: 1900–1914 (early 20th century)
- Built: 1911

Site notes
- Architect: Colin Deighton
- Architectural styles: Arts & Crafts, Gothic

Queensland Heritage Register
- Official name: St Michael and All Angels Church
- Type: state heritage
- Designated: 17 September 2010
- Reference no.: 602763
- Significant components: church

St Michael and All Angels Church is a heritage-listed Anglican church at 2–6 Alford Street, Kingaroy, South Burnett Region, Queensland, Australia. It was designed by Colin Deighton and built in 1911. It was added to the Queensland Heritage Register on 17 September 2010.

== History ==
St Michael and All Angels Anglican Church, located in Alford Street, is an elegant timber building designed by architect Colin Deighton and erected between December 1910 and 1911. Its intact timber interior exhibits superior craftsmanship. The land on which the church is sited was donated by Arthur Youngman of Taabinga who also contributed to the church's building fund.

Settlement in the Kingaroy area commenced in the 1840s when Taabinga and Burrandowan pastoral stations were taken up, and was followed by agricultural land selection from the 1880s. Selectors grew maize and raised pigs, which were sold at Kilkivan (the nearest railhead on the Kilkivan branch railway) for many years. With the approach of the rail line from Kilkivan, transportation of produce to markets became more feasible and the struggling agricultural settlements of the South Burnett became viable.

The town of Kingaroy owes its establishment to the arrival of the Kilkivan branch railway in 1904. In 1898 the only resident in the vicinity of Kingaroy was Daniel Carroll who had selected a 160-acre block abutting the 3430 acre Kingaroy Paddock selection in 1891 and built a hut and yard for his horses. By 1900 he had built a cottage and had selected further blocks of land adjoining his original portion. In 1902 a provisional school opened in Kingaroy with about twenty pupils. Once the Kilkivan branch railway reached the 56-mile (90 km) peg near the corner of the Kingaroy Paddock in 1904, the railway terminus was the impetus for the establishment of Kingaroy township. Both Carroll and Arthur Youngman, owner of the Kingaroy Paddock, sold town blocks at public auction during 1904. When the first train arrived, there were only three buildings - Carroll's new hotel, the Carrollee, FC Petersen's store and Carroll Cottage. After the railway arrived Kingaroy quickly developed as a service centre with the establishment of commercial premises such as shops and hotels. These were soon followed by public buildings, churches and schools. The seven years during which Kingaroy was the railhead were enough for it to establish a lasting dominance over neighbouring townships.

During the first four decades of the 20th century the South Burnett was a rapidly developing agricultural area in the Wide Bay district. The railway facilitated the clearing of the land for agriculture and timber became the major industry for some years with teams hauling logs to the Kingaroy railway yards. From c. 1910 the Wide Bay region's maize production was the second highest in the state, following the Darling Downs. It was the fourth largest wheat producing area and the fourth largest cotton producer in Queenslsand. During the 1920s the embryonic peanut industry became headquartered at Kingaroy. In 1929 the Wide Bay district's milk production was the second highest in the state after the Moreton district. By 1938 dairying in the Burnett district was burgeoning, having the second largest number of dairy herds and of dairy cows in Queensland after Moreton district. By 1941 Kingaroy was the largest town in the South Burnett region.

Initially, Anglican services and Sunday School in Kingaroy were conducted by Reverend Percy Solly Wigram of Nanango parish in a hut that stood on the site now occupied by Carroll's buildings in Haly Street. However, with the rapid growth of the Kingaroy congregation a church became essential. Circa 1910 the congregation was offered two pieces of land for this purpose; one by Dan Carroll and the other by Arthur Youngman of Taabinga, who also was willing to make a donation to the building fund. Youngman's offer was accepted and a Diocesan grant was obtained for the Church's construction. Architect Colin Deighton, who was assistant to John Hingeston Buckeridge, the Anglican Diocese of Brisbane Architect between 1887 and 1901, designed the church. Deighton designed a number of country churches and St Colomb's Anglican Church at Clayfield in Brisbane.

The foundation stone of St Michael and All Angels Church was laid on 10 November 1910 by the Venerable Arthur Rivers, Archdeacon of Toowoomba. Construction of the building, which was to seat 250 worshippers, began in December 1910 and was completed in 1911. Its cost, including furniture, was almost £2000. The church was dedicated by Archbishop of Brisbane St Clair Donaldson in 1912 at a service attended by members of the whole community which regarded its opening as a great event for the growing township. In 1912 the Brisbane Diocese newsletter, The Church Chronicle, stated that St Michael and All Angels Church was "a really beautiful Church - one of the best wooden buildings in the Diocese".

The church was built in a cruciform plan with few internal wall planes, an arched ceiling space formed by an exposed scissor-braced roof frame and a tall nave and arched windows giving the illusion of verticality.

The timber interior of St Michael and all Angels Church is believed to have been milled at Taabinga. The red beanwood pulpit and pews were made from timber from the Atherton Tableland. The vicar, the Rev PS Wigram, who was a member of a wealthy English family, received gifts for the church. These included a carved English oak altar with inset panels of the angels painted by members of his family; an altar cross and candlesticks from Venice; and the chalice and paten, which were gifts from his godparents. A picture of St Peter, painted by a German artist, was presented by another English friend of the rector.

Some time after 1912 the Nanango parish was divided into three - Nanango, Kingaroy and Wondai - each served by its own priest. A house for the rector (pre-1935) and later a hall were constructed on the site to fulfil the needs of the growing congregation. A wheelchair access ramp has been added to the northern side of the entry porch. On 14 November 1993 the church was consecrated by Assistant Bishop of Brisbane Clyde Wood.

The development of a peanut storage and processing plant by the Peanut Board and Peanut Growers' Cooperative Association on adjacent land began in 1927. The success of the Kingaroy-based peanut industry has resulted in a large industrial site becoming the backdrop to the church. This juxtaposition highlights the aesthetically pleasing nature of St Michael and All Angels Anglican Church.

The church has served the Anglican community in the Parish of Kingaroy since its establishment in 1910.

== Description ==
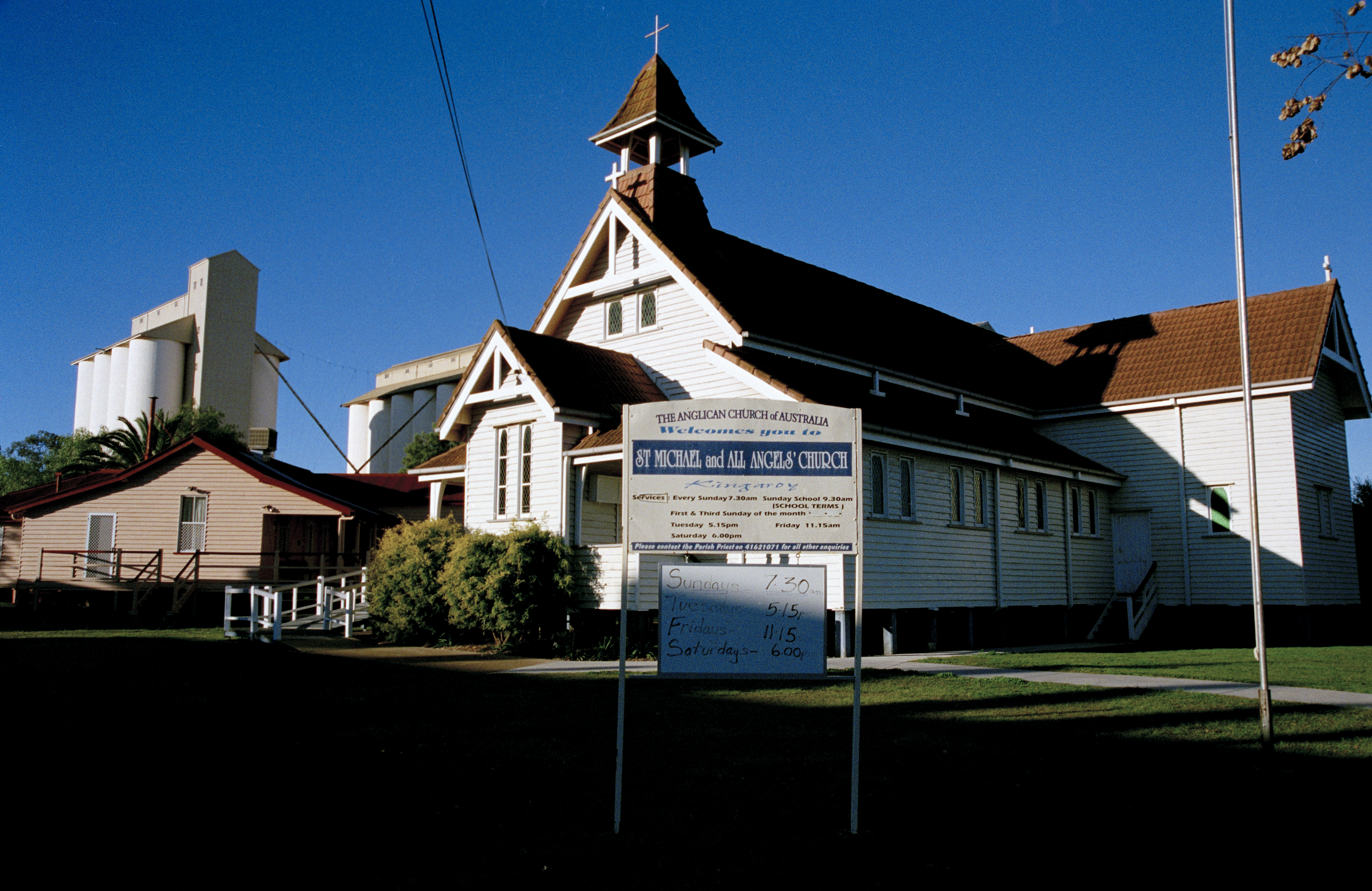
Church with the Kingaroy Peanut Silos in the background, 2005

St Michael and All Angels Church, Kingaroy is a very intact example of an early twentieth century timber-framed church and is positioned on a largely flat site to the east of Kingaroy's main retail street. Its grounds are triangular in shape and are bound to the east by the former Kingaroy-Nanango railway easement and by Alford Street to the south. The church is oriented along an east–west axis with the entry porch to the west. The towering silos of the Peanut Company of Australia stand to the north of the church grounds and form a dominant backdrop to the place.

The church building is laid out in a typical cruciform plan with a central nave formed by a long, steeply gabled roof. This main roof is dissected by another gabled roof slightly lower in height which forms the north and south transepts. The northern transept contains a side-chapel and southern transept contains a vestry. Aisles are formed to the north and south of the nave by lower lean-to roofs running along its length. A gabled entry porch with hipped returns provides a protective covered entrance to the church from the west.

The roofs to the church are clad with recent terracotta roof tiles and external walls are clad with weatherboards. It is supported on a mixture of timber and concrete stumps approximately one metre from the ground. Gutters are formed in metal with a quad-profile and drain to recent square profile downpipes.

The main elevation (facing west) of the church is symmetrical in form with the entry porch projecting out from the main gabled structure. A timber-framed bellcote crowns the ridge of the main roof above the entry porch and is clad to match the main roof. Bracing fixed between the roofs' bargeboards form decorative ends to each of the projecting gable roofs. The entry porch is accessed via steps from the south and by a recent timber-framed ramp from the north. Decorative post brackets form arched openings on the porch which is enclosed to handrail height with weatherboards.

Windows with frames decorated at the top to make an arch and filled with leadlighting illuminate the length of the nave. Stained glass windows are positioned in the side chapel and chancel walls. The shapes of the arches formed by carved frames in windows throughout vary depending on the width of the opening. Clerestory coloured leadlight windows are located on the northern and southern walls above the chancel. Crosses are fixed to the top of the bellcote and to each apex of the gabled roofs. Timber-framed steps lead from the southern side of the building to the vestry and on the northern side to the side-chapel. A pair of simple, ledged, double doors provide access into the church from the double entry porch via the ramp and stairs. The interior timberwork is unpainted.

The building's exposed timber framing dominates the interior of the building. Scissor-braces fixed to pairs of rafters supporting the roof cross the width of the nave and the north and south transepts. Metal tie-rods are located at regular intervals in the ceiling space which is lined with unpainted v-jointed boards. The aisles are divided from the nave by a colonnade of timber arches supporting the main roof formed from timber posts and decorative timber brackets. The chancel is separated from the nave and crossing by a timber framed chancel arch with a variation of a rood screen formed in timber supporting a wooden crucifix. All timberwork is unpainted.

The chancel is slightly raised and contains the altar which is formed from carved English oak. Early inset panels of paintings of angels have been relocated behind the altar to the eastern wall where dark timber panelled wall linings with lightly coloured cover strips are located. Intricately detailed candlesticks and an altar cross rest on the altar and timber communion or altar rails are located in front of it.

A baptistery is located to the west of the side chapel with an intricately carved marble font. An early pulpit (located to the north of the chancel) and early pews positioned in the nave and the crossing are made from red beanwood. Organ pipes are located near the southern transept facing towards the nave. A timber hymnal board is fixed to the wall at the western end of the nave near the entry. The floor is carpeted.

Garden beds planted with roses lie to the west of the church where a large, timber cross has been positioned. A spray of trees follows the boundary of the site creating a barrier to the railway siding. A simple timber framed entry arch is located on the Alford Street boundary where a recent concrete path leading from the street to the entry porch and vestry has been constructed.

== Heritage listing ==
St Michael and All Angels Church was listed on the Queensland Heritage Register on 17 September 2010 having satisfied the following criteria.

The place is important in demonstrating the evolution or pattern of Queensland's history.

St Michael and All Angels Anglican Church illustrates the growth and prosperity of the township, which resulted from the extension of the railway line to Kingaroy in 1904. Kingaroy's role as the terminus of the rail line for the subsequent seven years consolidated its position as the major town of the South Burnett region, which evolved into one of Queensland's major agricultural districts during the first decades of the 20th century.

The construction of St Michael and All Angels Anglican Church between 1910 and 1911, to serve the spiritual needs of Kingaroy's rapidly expanding population, is associated with this period of significant growth in the district.

The place is important in demonstrating the principal characteristics of a particular class of cultural places.

St Michael and All Angels Anglican Church is an excellent example of a timber-framed church, which at the time of construction was considered one of the best timber buildings in the Brisbane Diocese. Highly intact, it demonstrates the principal characteristics of an early 20th century Anglican church utilising a Latin cross plan with the northern transept accommodating a chapel, the southern transept a vestry and the western end an entry porch.

The place is important because of its aesthetic significance.

St Michael and All Angels Church has considerable aesthetic value being a well composed building in a cruciform plan. The Church is significant for its high degree of creative achievement in its interior craftsmanship. The highly intact, unpainted timberwork of the roof framing, walls and ceiling linings displays great artistic value. The church contains many finely crafted elements including an exposed roof frame which dominates the interior, ornate timber colonnades, rood screen, chancel arch, carved English oak altar, pulpit, bishop's chair, pews, panels of the angels and crucifix. Elaborately decorated candlesticks, chalice and paten and a painting of St Peter are also housed in the church.

Its steeply pitched roof crested with an ornate bellcote makes a strong impact in the streetscape.
