= Shire of Kingaroy =

Coordinates: 26°05′08.90″S 152°14′21.52″E

- Local government area
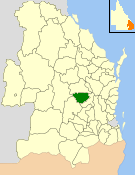
- Location within Queensland

- Country: Australia
- State: Queensland
- Region: South Burnett
- Established: 1912
- Council seat: Kingaroy

Area
  - Total: 2,420.3 km^{2} (934.5 sq mi)

Population
  - Total: 12,285 (2006 census)
  - Density: 5.07582/km^{2} (13.1463/sq mi)
- Website: Shire of Kingaroy
LGAs around Shire of Kingaroy
| Wondai | Wondai | Murgon |
| Chinchilla | Shire of Kingaroy | Murgon |
| Wambo | Wambo | Nanango |

The Shire of Kingaroy was a local government area in the South Burnett area of Queensland, Australia, about 100 kilometres (62 mi) northwest of the capital, Brisbane. The shire covered an area of 2,420.3 square kilometres (934.5 sq mi), and existed as a local government area from 1912 until 2008, when it amalgamated with a number of other local government areas in the South Burnett area to become the South Burnett Region.

The seat of the shire was the town of Kingaroy, which continues as the set of the South Burnett Region.

The shire's name derives from the Wakka Wakka Aboriginal words "king dhu'roi", meaning "ant hungry". While land use was dominantly pastoral in the area's early European history, dairying, beef, small crops and in particular peanut farming became mainstays of Kingaroy's economy.

== History ==
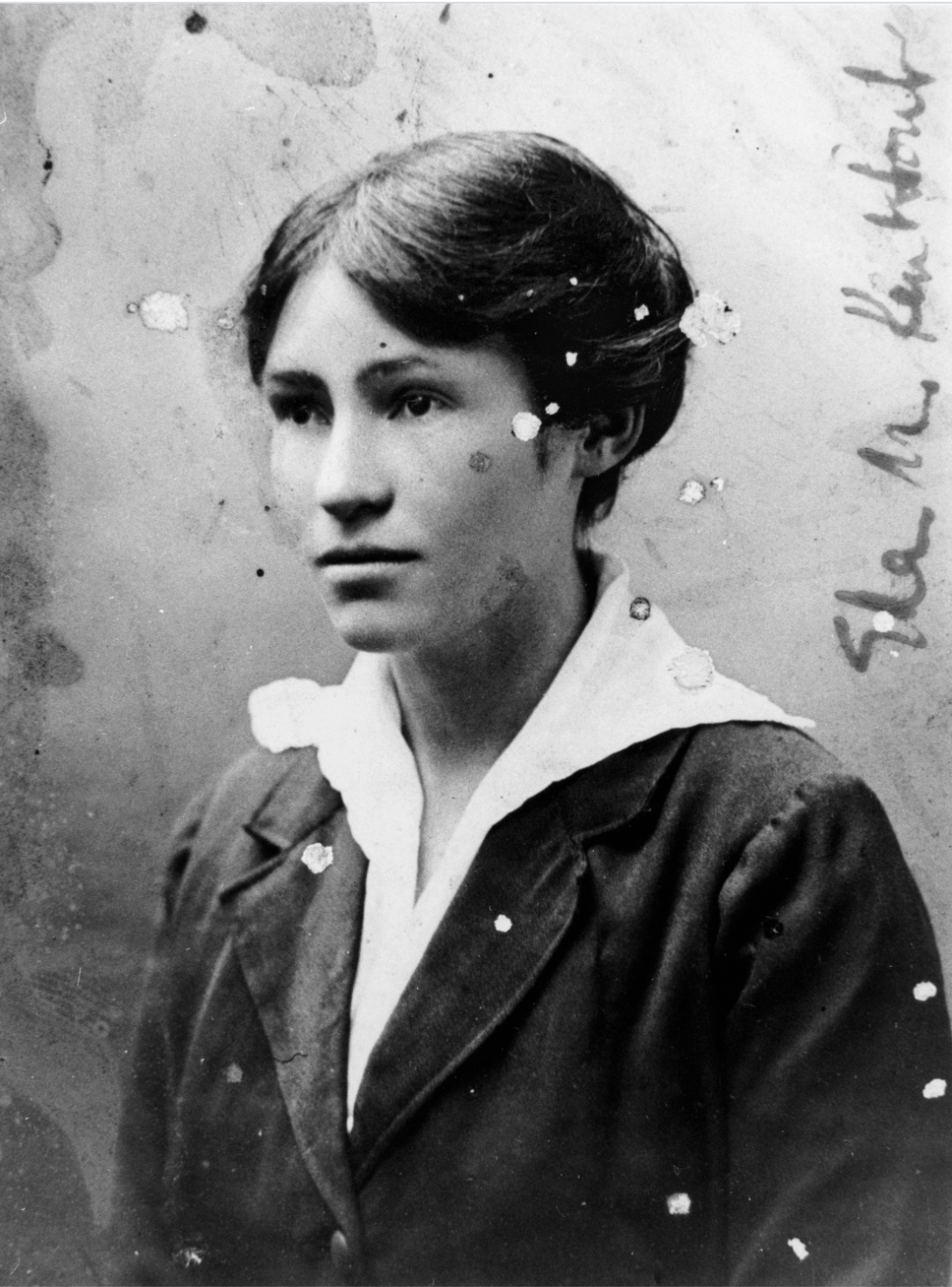
Dr Ellen Kent Hughes

Kingaroy was originally part of the Barambah (later Nanango) Divisional Board, which was created on 11 November 1879 under the Divisional Boards Act 1879. With the passage of the Local Authorities Act 1902, Nanango became a shire council on 31 March 1903.

The town of Kingaroy started to grow after the arrival of the railway in 1904, and on 12 January 1912, the Shire of Kingaroy was proclaimed.

In 1923, Dr Ellen Kent Hughes was elected to the Kingaroy Shire Council, the first woman council member elected to a local government council in Queensland.

On 15 March 2008, under the Local Government (Reform Implementation) Act 2007 passed by the Parliament of Queensland on 10 August 2007, the Shire of Kingaroy merged with the Shires of Murgon, Nanango and Wondai to form the South Burnett Regional Council.

== Towns and localities ==
The Shire of Kingaroy included the following settlements:

- Kingaroy
- Coolabunia
- Goodger
- Inverlaw
- Kumbia
- Memerambi
- Taabinga
- Wooroolin

== Chairmen ==
- 1927: R. S. Brown

Other notable members of the Kingaroy Council include:

- 1923–1924: Ellen Kent Hughes
- 1946–1949: Joh Bjelke-Petersen, Premier of Queensland
- 1976–1990: Warren Truss, Deputy Prime Minister of Australia

== Population ==
| Year | Population |
|---|---|
| 1933 | 6,844 |
| 1947 | 8,063 |
| 1954 | 8,059 |
| 1961 | 8,548 |
| 1966 | 8,339 |
| 1971 | 7,868 |
| 1976 | 7,801 |
| 1981 | 7,939 |
| 1986 | 9,902 |
| 1991 | 10,395 |
| 1996 | 11,141 |
| 2001 | 11,415 |
| 2006 | 12,285 |
