= Shire of Wondai =

Coordinates: 26°19′16.44″S 151°52′29.52″E

- Local government area
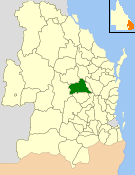
- Location within Queensland

- Country: Australia
- State: Queensland
- Region: South Burnett
- Established: 1910
- Council seat: Wondai

Area
  - Total: 3,577.6 km^{2} (1,381.3 sq mi)

Population
  - Total: 4,375 (2006 census)
  - Density: 1.22289/km^{2} (3.1673/sq mi)
- Website: Shire of Wondai
LGAs around Shire of Wondai
| Mundubbera | Mundubbera | Gayndah |
| Chinchilla | Shire of Wondai | Murgon |
| Chinchilla | Kingaroy | Nanango |

The Shire of Wondai was a local government area located in the South Burnett region of Queensland, Australia, about 140 kilometres (87 mi) northwest of the capital, Brisbane. The shire covered an area of 3,577.6 square kilometres (1,381.3 sq mi), and existed as a local government entity from 1910 until 2008, when it amalgamated with several other councils in the South Burnett area to form the South Burnett Region.

Major activities in the shire include beef and timber.

== History ==
Initially part of the Barambah Division, which was proclaimed in 1879 under the Divisional Boards Act 1879, the area that later became Wondai Shire became part of the Kilkivan Division when it was excised from Barambah Division in 1888. With the adopting of the Local Authorities Act 1902, divisions were redesignated as shires.

With the formation of the Wondai Farmers Progress Association in 1905, pressure for the area to have its own shire council resulted ultimately in the creation of the Shire of Wienholt on 1 January 1910. It was created by amalgamating parts of Kilkivan, Nanango, Rawbelle (Gayndah) and Wambo Shires.

On 12 January 1912 part of Wienholt Shire was amalgamated with part of Nanango Shire and part of Wambo Shire to form Kingaroy Shire.

On 20 January 1914 a further part of Wienholt Shire was amalgamated with part of Kilkivan Shire to form Murgon Shire.

Later in 1914, on 1 August, the Shire of Wienholt was renamed the Shire of Wondai.

On 15 March 2008, under the Local Government (Reform Implementation) Act 2007 passed by the Parliament of Queensland on 10 August 2007, the Shire of Wondai merged with the Shires of Kingaroy, Murgon and Nanango to form the South Burnett Region.

== Towns and localities ==
The Shire of Wondai included the following settlements:

- Wondai
- Boondooma
- Durong
- Ficks Crossing
- Hivesville
- Mondure
- Proston
- Tingoora
- Wheatlands

== Chairmen ==
- 1927: P. Campbell

== Population ==
| Year | Population |
|---|---|
| 1933 | 4,835 |
| 1947 | 4,626 |
| 1954 | 4,850 |
| 1961 | 4,510 |
| 1966 | 4,332 |
| 1971 | 3,740 |
| 1976 | 3,329 |
| 1981 | 3,456 |
| 1986 | 3,785 |
| 1991 | 3,819 |
| 1996 | 3,971 |
| 2001 | 4,041 |
| 2006 | 4,375 |
