= Shire of Nanango =

Coordinates: 26°40′14.3″S 151°59′59.9″E

- Local government area
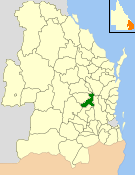
- Location within Queensland

- Country: Australia
- State: Queensland
- Region: South Burnett
- Established: 1879
- Council seat: Nanango

Area
  - Total: 1,738.4 km^{2} (671.2 sq mi)

Population
  - Total: 9,049 (2006 census)
  - Density: 5.2054/km^{2} (13.4818/sq mi)
- Website: Shire of Nanango
LGAs around Shire of Nanango
Kingaroy	Murgon	Kilkivan
Wambo	Shire of Nanango	Cooloola
Rosalie	Crows Nest	Esk

The Shire of Nanango was a local government area located in the South Burnett region of Queensland, Australia, about 100 kilometres (62 mi) northwest of the capital, Brisbane. The Shire covered an area of 1,738.4 square kilometres (671.2 sq mi), and existed as a local government entity from 1879 until 2008, when it amalgamated with several other councils in the South Burnett area to become the South Burnett Regional Council.

== History ==
The logo of the council

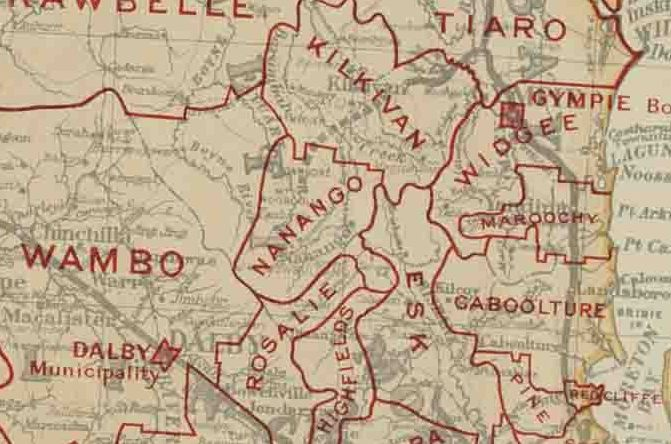
- Map of Nanango Division and adjacent local government areas, March 1902

Barambah Division was created on 11 November 1879 as one of 74 divisions around Queensland under the Divisional Boards Act 1879 with a population of 1539.

On 23 February 1882, there was a realignment of boundaries between Wambo Division and Barambah Division, involving subdivision 3 of Wambo Division and subdivisions 1 and 2 of Barambah Division.

Kilkivan Division was created on 1 July 1886 from the western part of the Widgee Division and part of the Barambah Division under the Divisional Boards Act 1879. However, the changes to Widgee's boundaries were not welcomed by the Widgee Divisional Board; they felt so much territory had been removed from Widgee Division that it was effectively abolished and the board members all threatened to resign in protest. The government then hastily abolished Kilkivan Division on 30 July 1886, only four weeks after it was created, leading to protests by the residents of Kilkivan. Arguments about boundaries continued for a year. Kilkivan Division was eventually re-constituted on 17 November 1887, comprising part of No. 2 subdivision of Widgee Division and part of the No. 2 subdivision and all of the No. 3 subdivision of Barambah Division, to be governed by a board of six members.

In 1888, Barambah Division was renamed Nanango Division.

With the passage of the Local Authorities Act 1902, the Nanango Division became the Shire of Nanango on 31 March 1903.

On 25 February 1909 part of Nanango Shire was amalgamated with part of the Shire of Kilkivan, part of the Shire of Rawbelle and part of the Shire of Wambo to create the Shire of Wienholt.

On 12 January 1912 a further part of Nanango Shire was amalgamated with a further part of the Shire of Wambo and part of the Shire of Wienholt to create the Shire of Kingaroy.

On 15 March 2008, under the Local Government (Reform Implementation) Act 2007 passed by the Parliament of Queensland on 10 August 2007, the Shire of Nanango merged with the Shires of Kingaroy, Murgon and Wondai to form the South Burnett Regional Council.

== Towns ==
The Shire of Nanango included the following settlements:

- Nanango
- Benarkin
- Blackbutt
- Brooklands
- Bunya Mountains
- Maidenwell

== Population ==
Year	Population
1933	4,073
1947	4,184
1954	3,938
1961	3,743
1966	3,501
1971	3,244
1976	2,961
1981	4,149
1986	5,326
1991	6,735
1996	7,810
2001	8,230
2006	9,049

== Chairmen ==
- 1909: E. G. Lord
- 1920: John Archibald Lee
- 1926: John Archibald Lee
