= Memerambi, Queensland =

Memerambi
- Town
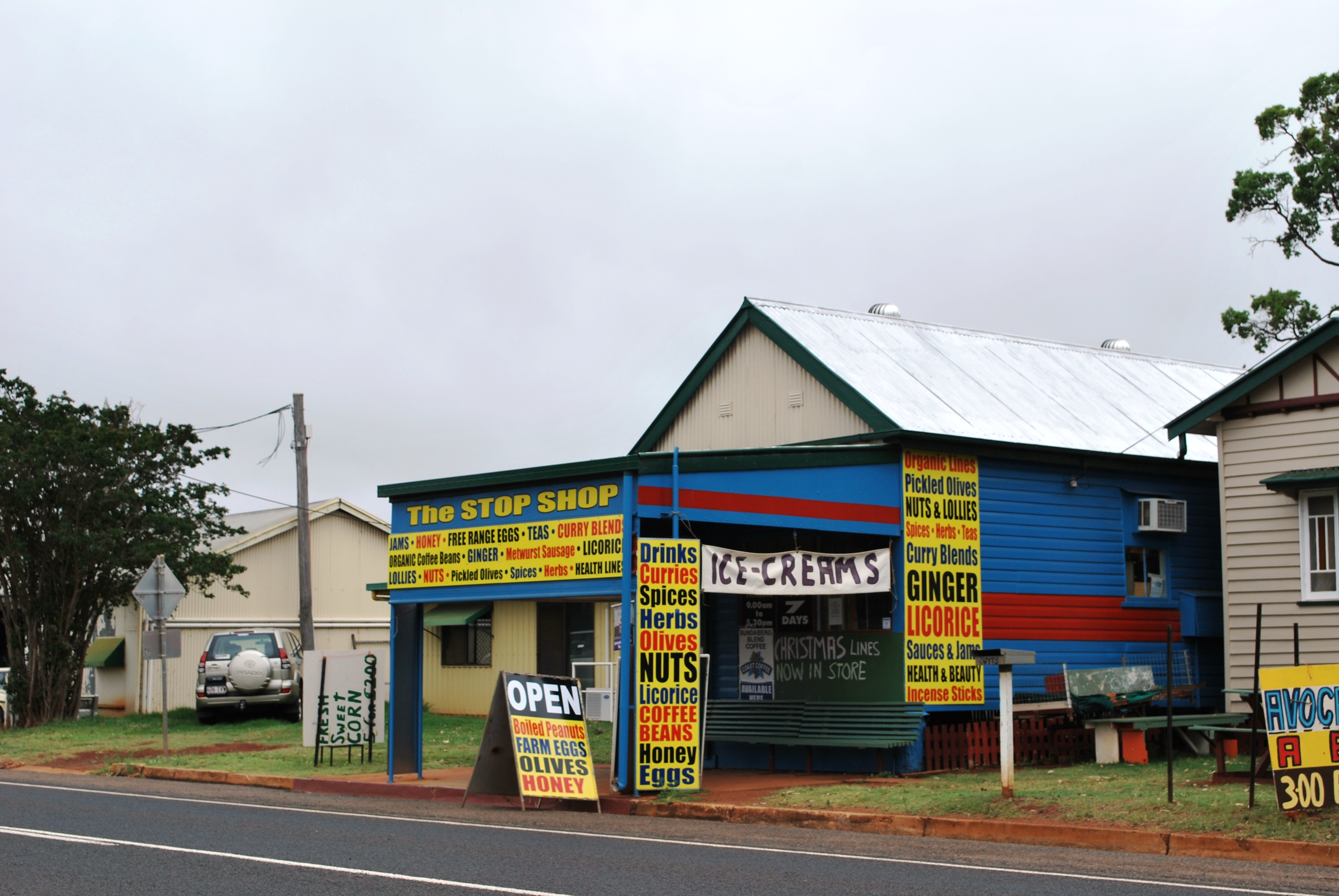
- The "Stop Shop"

- Interactive map of Memerambi
- Coordinates: 26.4497°S 151.8233°E
- Country: Australia
- State: Queensland
- LGA: South Burnett Region
- Location: 12.1 km (7.5 mi) N of Kingaroy; 126 km (78 mi) WSW of Gympie; 164 km (102 mi) N of Toowoomba; 224 km (139 mi) NW of Brisbane

Government
  - State electorate: Nanango
  - Federal division: Maranoa

Area
  - Total: 30.7 km^{2} (11.9 sq mi)

Population
  - Total: 338 (2021 census)
  - Density: 11.01/km^{2} (28.52/sq mi)
- Time zone: UTC+10:00 (AEST)
- Postcode: 4610
Localities around Memerambi
Wooroolin	Wooroolin	Corndale
Gordonbrook	Memerambi	Corndale
Crawford	Crawford	Kingaroy

Memerambi is a rural town and locality in the South Burnett Region, Queensland, Australia. In the 2021 census, the locality of Memerambi had a population of 338 people.

== Geography ==
The town is on the Bunya Highway, 239 kilometres (149 mi) north west of the state capital, Brisbane.

The Nanango railway line ran immediately west of the highway with the town being served by the Memerambi railway station (26.4516°S 151.8225°E).

== History ==
The name Memerambi is an Aboriginal word for the sugargum tree.

The town was surveyed on 7 May 1904 by surveyor Hector Munro. On 17 October 1904, the first government land sales occurred in the new town of Memerambi with 58 town lots and 74 suburban lots on offer.

On 19 December 1904, the final stage of the Nanango railway line from Murgon to Kingaroy was opened with Memeambi railway station serving the town. This section of the line was closed in July 1964.

Memerambi Provisional School opened on 16 October 1905. On 1 January 1909, it became Memerambi State School. The school celebrated its centenary on 15 October 2005. It was mothballed on 31 December 2006 and closed on 23 October 2007. The school was at 1-27 King Street (26.4505°S 151.8279°E). The school's website was archived.

Memerambi Methodist Church was built in 1908 at a cost of £100. It could seat 100 people. It was on the corner of Corndale Road and Earl Street (26.451455°S 151.824°E). In 1956, it was relocated to Corndale.

A postal receiving office opened in Memerambi in 1909. Memerambi Post Office opened September 1910 and closed in 1978.

All Saints' Anglican Church was dedicated on 9 April 1912. It closed circa 1966.

Memerambi was once a bustling centre with a hotel, two general stores, saddlery, butcher, bank, mobile sawmill and cheese factory.

== Demographics ==
In the 2006 census, the locality of Memerambi and the surrounding area had a population of 541 people.

In the 2016 census, the locality of Memerambi had a population of 272 people.

In the 2021 census, the locality of Memerambi had a population of 338 people.

== Education ==
There are no schools in Memerambi. The nearest government primary schools are Wooroolin State School in neighbouring Wooroolin to the north and Crawford State School in neighbouring Crawford to the south. The nearest government secondary school is Kingaroy State High School in Kingaroy to the south.

== Facilities ==
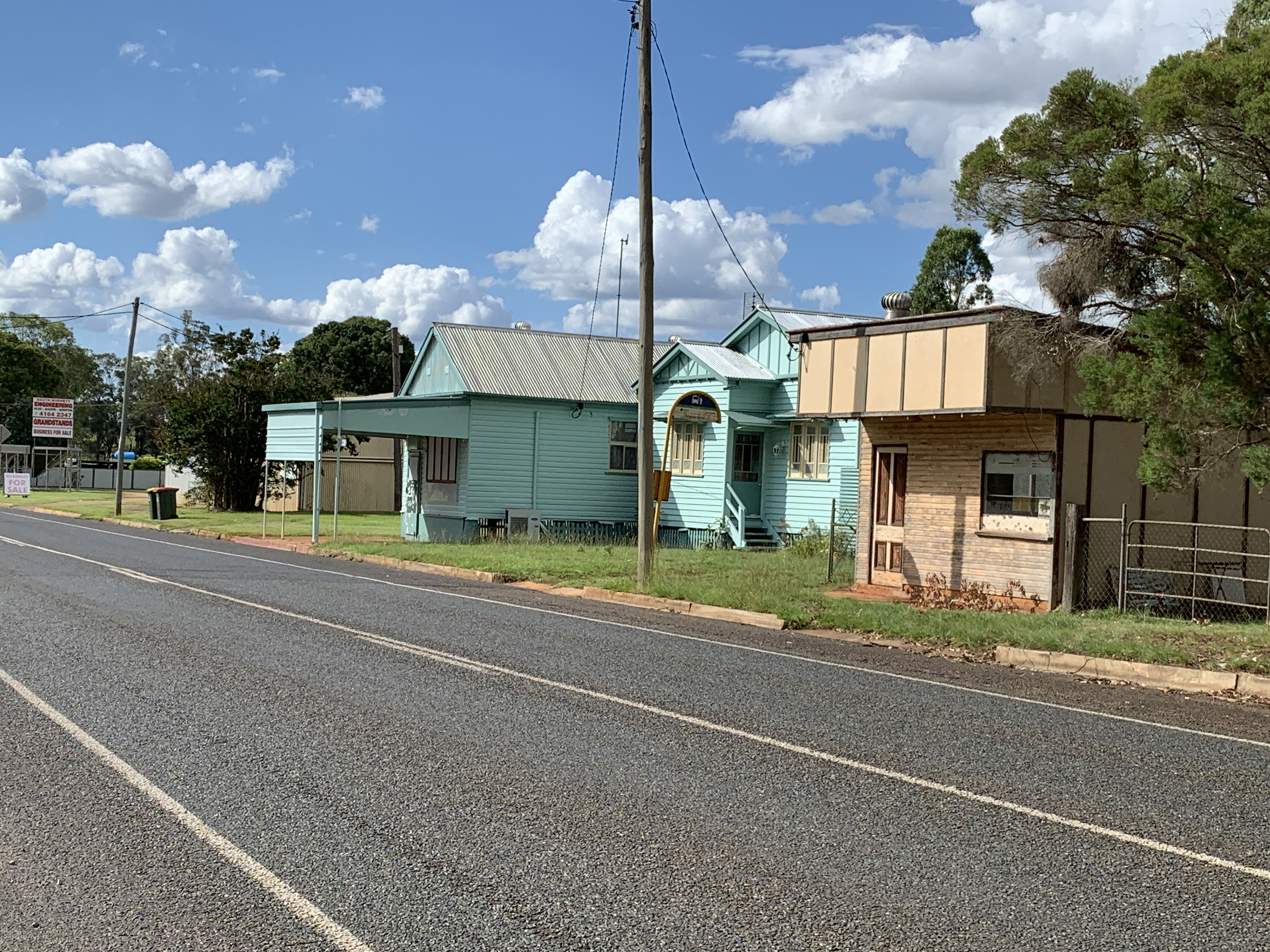
Old closed shops on Bunya Highway, main street in Memerambi, 2023

Today businesses in Memerambi include 'Stop Shop' general store; clock repairs; large machinery & engineering works; pharmaceutical manufacturing; stock feed store; graziers; concreting & pool construction.

== Notable residents ==
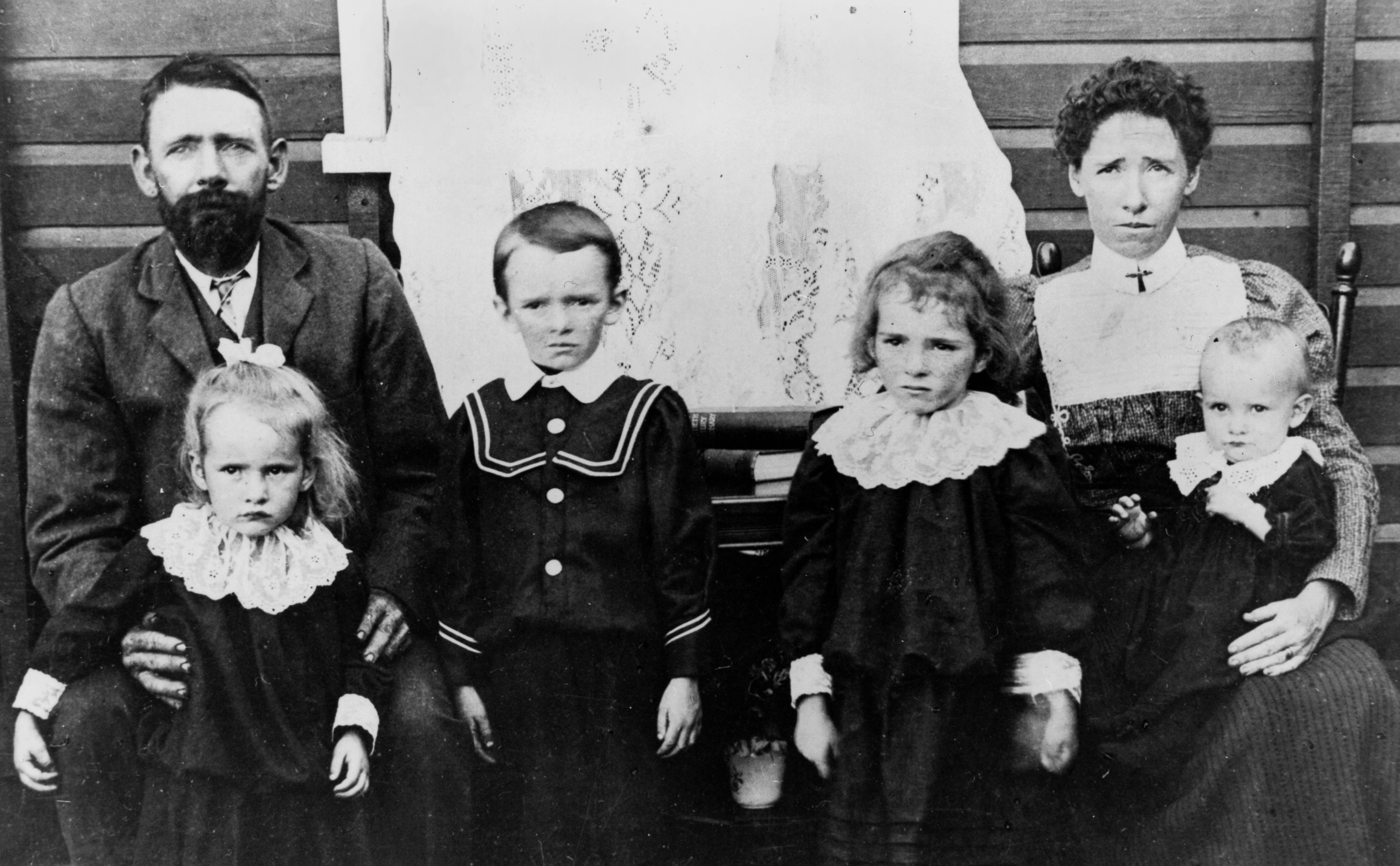
Mr T. J. Kingston and family, first storekeepers of Memerambi, circa 1910

Mr and Mrs T.J Kingston were the first storekeepers in Memerambi.

Arthur Benjamin Postle, a professional sprinter known as "The Crimson Flash", was acclaimed "the fastest man in the world" in 1906. He moved to Memerambi in 1913 and operated his own auctioning business there.

Ben and Harry Young, of Memerambi, pioneers of the South Burnett peanut industry, planted the first commercial crop of peanuts in the South Burnett in 1919. These brothers were sons of a Chinese immigrant, Ah Young. Harry Young later designed the first peanut thresher in Queensland and Ben became a director of the Peanut Marketing Board.

== See also ==
- Kingaroy Peanut Silos
