= Kingaroy Peanut Silos =

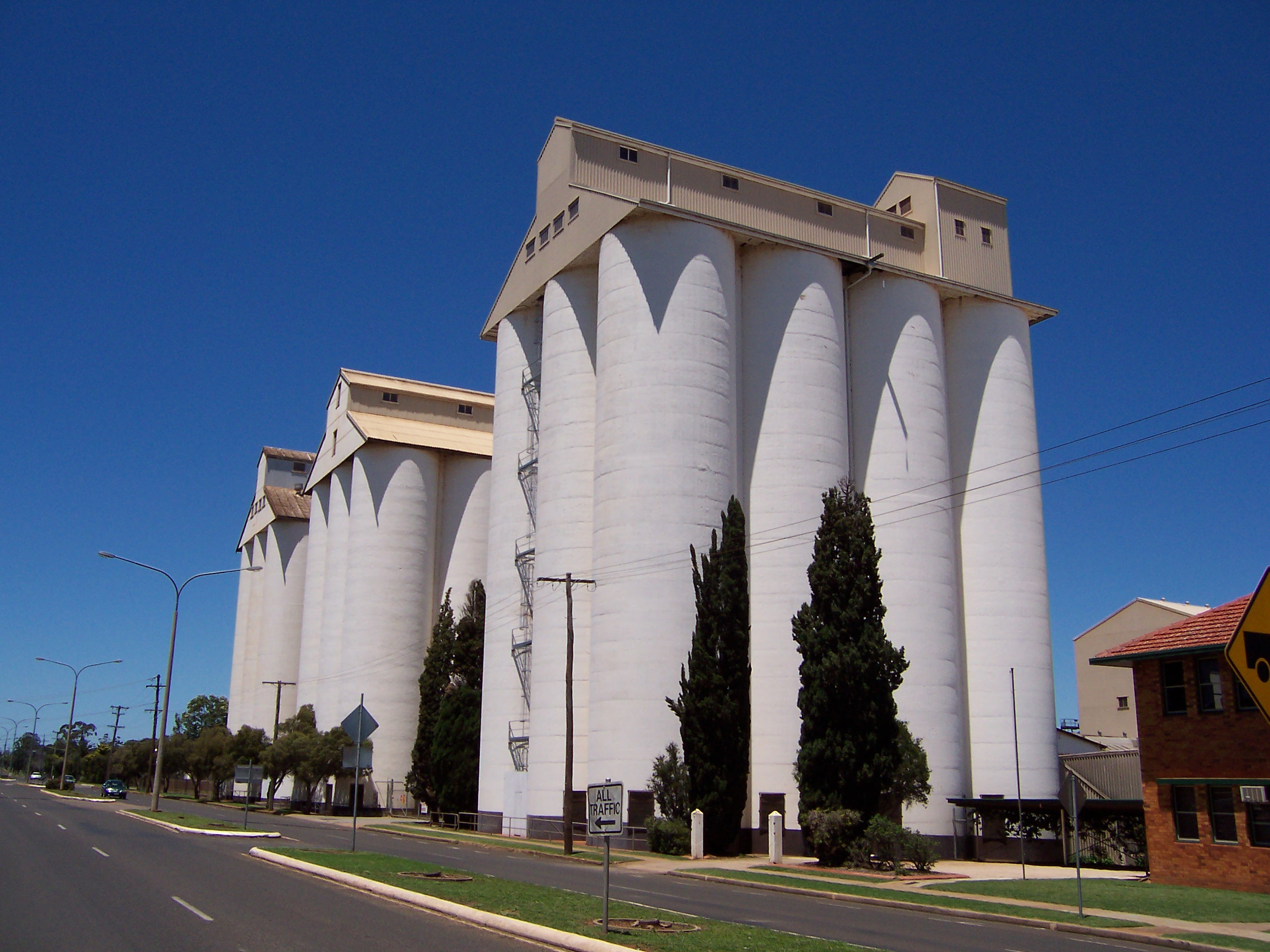
- 2005

- Location within Queensland Location within Australia
- 26.54°S 151.8416°E
- Location: 117–131 Haly Street, Kingaroy, South Burnett Region, Queensland, Australia

History
- Design period: 1919–1930s (interwar period)
- Built: 1938

Site notes
- Architect(s): Thomas Robinson & Son, Macdonald Wagner Consulting Engineers

Queensland Heritage Register
- Official name: Kingaroy Peanut Silos
- Type: state heritage
- Designated: 8 October 2010
- Reference no.: 602764
- Significant components: silo
- Builders: Kell & Rigby

Kingaroy Peanut Silos are heritage-listed silos at 117–131 Haly Street, Kingaroy, South Burnett Region, Queensland, Australia. They were designed by Thomas Robinson & Son and Macdonald Wagner Consulting Engineers and built in 1938 by Kell & Rigby. They were added to the Queensland Heritage Register on 8 October 2010.

== History ==
The Kingaroy Peanut Silos located in Haly Street, Kingaroy are a group of three concrete silos (Nos 2, 3 and 4) that were constructed between 1938 and 1951 by the Queensland Peanut Marketing Board for storage of peanuts before their processing and marketing. These large structures dominate the skyline of Kingaroy and the surrounding landscape. They are widely recognised symbols of the peanut growing and processing industry in Queensland that developed as a commercial enterprise in the South Burnett centred upon Kingaroy and which has been managed from this town since the 1920s.

Although initial pastoral settlement in the Kingaroy area commenced in the 1840s when Taabinga station and Burrandowan station were taken up, the town of Kingaroy owes its establishment to the arrival of the Kilkivan branch railway in 1904. In 1898 the only resident in the vicinity of Kingaroy was Daniel Carroll who had selected a 160-acre block abutting the 3,430 acres (1,390 hectares) Kingaroy Paddock selection in 1891 and built a hut and yard for his horses. By 1900 he had erected a cottage and had selected further blocks of land adjoining his original portion. In 1902 a provisional school opened in Kingaroy with about twenty pupils. Once the Kilkivan branch railway reached the 56-mile (90 km) peg near the corner of the Kingaroy Paddock in 1904, the railway terminus was the impetus for the establishment of Kingaroy township. Both Carroll and Arthur Youngman, owner of the Kingaroy Paddock, auctioned town blocks at public auction during 1904. When the first train arrived, there were only three buildings - Carroll's new hotel, the Carrollee, FC Petersen's store and Carroll Cottage. After the arrival of the railway Kingaroy quickly developed as a service centre with the establishment of commercial premises such as shops and hotels. These were soon followed by public buildings, churches and schools. The seven years during which Kingaroy was the railhead were sufficient for it to establish a lasting dominance over neighbouring townships.

Peanuts have been grown in Queensland since Chinese cultivators planted them on the Palmer River goldfield in the 1870s. Small acreages were grown by several farmers in the South Burnett from about 1901 and these peanuts were sold to confectioners and shops in Brisbane, Maryborough and Rockhampton. From c. 1920 significant acreages in the South Burnett became devoted to peanut growing.

A major boost to the peanut growers was the establishment of the Marrickville Margarine Company's oil expression plant at Marrickville, New South Wales in 1921. The company purchased almost the entire 1921–1922 crop in the South Burnett and may have created the demand which made the establishment and growth of the industry possible. Further stimulus was provided by the establishment of other companies, such as Nut Foods Pty Ltd in 1924, to produce peanut products such as peanut paste and salted and roasted peanuts that entered this business around this time.

Subsequently, more farmers in the South Burnett began peanut-growing. In 1922, 61 long tons (62 t) were produced, rising to 75 long tons (76 t) in 1923 and to 231 long tons (235 t) in 1924. This increase in peanut growing coincided with a fall in the price received by farmers for maize, which had been their primary cash crop. However, in 1924 merchants were not prepared to pay what growers considered a reasonable price for the increased quantity of peanuts claiming there was a glut and offering prices as low as ? pence/lb. Consequently, growers refused to sell at a price insufficient to meet the costs of production. A meeting of growers held at Memerambi decided to approach the Minister for Agriculture and Stock to obtain approval for the formation of a Peanut Board under the Primary Products Pools Act 1922. Board members were elected and a strategy for marketing the current crop was established.

This strategy involved transforming the crop into a marketable condition to supply quality lines and deliver the product throughout the year as the market required it. The Board did this by deshelling, grading, culling and storing the peanuts. Meanwhile, the establishment of the Queensland Peanut Marketing Board was gazetted on 23 August 1924. The result for the first year of operations was satisfactory with growers paid approximately 4 pence/pound.

During the period 1919 to 1924 production for the whole of Queensland increased from57 to 448 long tons (58 to 455 t). The other areas in Queensland producing peanuts were Moreton, Port Curtis, Edgecombe, Rockingham, Cape York Peninsula and the Darling Downs/Maranoa divisions. Peanuts were grown in areas such as the North Coast region where fruit farmers grew 1–2 acres (0.40–0.81 ha) of peanuts as a side-line to their fruit production. Over time the peanut industry became concentrated in three areas of Queensland. The South Burnett, with Kingaroy as the headquarters of the Board, storage and treatment facilities, was the main area. A second area was in Central Queensland, especially along the coast, with Rockhampton as its centre. The third centre was on the Atherton Tableland with the Board's depot being located in Atherton.

Storage was one of the main needs of the South Burnett peanut growers. Silos were necessary to hold the nuts in dry storage, treat them if affected by damp, protect them from pests and allow controlled distribution so that the market was not flooded one year and short the next. Initially, the Peanut Board leased local barns and nuts were treated in the Railway's Grain Shed in the Railway Yard at Kingaroy. Realising that more permanent arrangements were required it was decided to build a block of silos, complete with treatment plant and machinery. The Board imposed a levy of ¼ pence/pound on peanuts delivered to the Board to cover the cost. In order to build the silos the growers formed the Queensland Peanut Growers' Cooperative Association Ltd. The Association issued shares to the growers in lieu of the levy received from the Board. In this way the growers themselves became the owners of any assets bought or built with the proceeds of their levy.

The Association was formed and registered under the Primary Producers' Cooperative Associations Act 1923 to 1926. Between September 1926 and August 1928 land fronting Haly Street and the railway line to the south was acquired as a site for operations. Located near the commercial centre of the town and adjacent to the railway line, the future headquarters of the Peanut Board was well sited for loading and unloading of produce. Accordingly, a timber-framed and -clad silo (No. 1) was constructed in 1928 adjacent to the Kingaroy/Kilkivan rail line formation, together with a long shed which housed machinery for cleaning, grading and shelling peanuts. A long shed built at the same time, called the "Dump", had a storage capacity of a further 1,200 long tons (1,200 t).

The industry continued to develop steadily with regulation by government and growers alike. Lobbying of the State and Commonwealth governments by the Board resulted in embargoes against the importation of peanuts and supportive legislation. In August 1930 the Queensland Government issued an Order-in-Council constituting a Peanut Marketing Board for 10 years to control all sales of peanuts produced in Queensland. Marketing problems were overcome finally with the passing in 1939 of The Peanut Industry Protection and Preservation Act by the Queensland government which ensured that the Board held control over the planting, grading, treatment and marketing of peanuts in Queensland through the health provisions of the Federal Constitution.

Continued expansion of the peanut industry necessitated the building of additional storage space at Kingaroy. By 1937 the crop was in excess of 4,000 long tons (4,100 t) and the chairman of the Board estimated that in the following year it would be around 7,000 long tons (7,100 t). This was an enormous increase from Australia's peanut production in the early 1930s, which was 800 long tons (810 t) per year. In 1937 additional land bounding the Queensland Peanut Growers' Cooperative Association Ltd's original purchases was acquired. Plans for the proposed set of modern concrete and brick silos were drawn in September 1937. A meeting of the Board and growers in the following month approved their construction. The silos, estimated to cost approximately £50,000, were to be ready for the next peanut crop. The engineers were Thomas Robinson & Son Consulting Engineers, Sydney in association with Macdonald Wagner consulting Engineers Sydney and Brisbane. They were built by Kell & Rigby, which also constructed the Kingaroy Shire Council Chambers, located opposite, at the same time. No 2 Silo consisted of 38 silo bins in total: 24 round bins each 20 feet (6.1 m) diameter and 85 feet (26 m) high (to top of the cone) plus 14 star shape bins being 75 feet (23 m) high (to top of the cone). This silo could contain up to 4,372 tons of peanuts. This silo was constructed and opened during 1938 at a cost of £57,750 of which £46,000 was advanced by the Commonwealth Bank under Queensland Government guarantee.

The Kingaroy Peanut Silos were officially opened on 1 December 1938 by the Minister for Agriculture and Stock, Frank Bulcock. After the ceremony at the silos, Bulcock officially opened the new Kingaroy Shire Council Chambers. Conducting both of these ceremonies on the same day symbolically expressed the Shire's confidence and its progress since formation, while acknowledging its dependence on agriculture to deliver its future prosperity.

The outbreak of war marked the beginning of a period of rapid development. The Commonwealth initially planned to commandeer the whole peanut crop for oil making purposes. However, as peanuts could be and were being imported in sufficient quantities for oil production, the Board challenged the acquisition order by recommending that Queensland peanuts be used mainly for edible purposes and only diverted to oil production should the need arise. This was accepted by the Australian Government and from 1943 until the end of the war the crop was sold by the Board under the control of the National Security Regulations.

By 1947 peanut production had reached a new peak with 1116 growers planting 52,000 acres (21,000 ha) which produced 23,164 long tons (23,536 t) of peanuts valued at £1,048 965/14/7. This rapid expansion of the peanut industry in the 1940s again created storage problems. To solve this, two new silos were planned. The first of these (No. 3 Silo) was completed late in 1948 at cost of between £100,000 and £110,000 and with a capacity of 5,200 long tons (5,300 t). It was built on lot 138 (3 roods 10 perches (3,300 m^{2})), which had been created from a road closure, the Deed of Grant for which was issued to the Queensland Peanut Growers' Cooperative Association Ltd after it was acquired for £216/4/0 8p on 6 August 1928.

The second block (No. 4 Silo) was completed by 1951 although its machinery was not installed until June that year. Its capacity was 2,200 long tons (2,200 t) and its cost upon completion was approximately £54,000. The loan for the construction of both silos was guaranteed by the Queensland Government.

On 6 February 1951 fire destroyed No 1 Silo and the Dump, while No 2 Silo and No 4 Silo were damaged. The fire started in the women's lunchroom at midday and the resulting fires from burning peanuts continued to blaze for months. In total the first caused a loss of £100,000 in peanuts and resulted in a peanut shortage throughout Australia for more than 12 months. No 2 Silo was repaired and the workhouse of No 4 Silo was repaired and re-equipped with treatment machinery. A bag shed and general purpose shed were later built on the site previously occupied by the Dump.

Between 1959 and 1980 Queensland produced almost the entire Australian peanut crop with the South Burnett producing just over half the State's production in 1979–80.

In 1992 major changes took place in the peanut industry. The marketing of peanuts in Queensland was de-regulated and the Peanut Marketing Board, which was a statutory marketing authority, was wound up on 27 May 1992. At that time the Board transferred all its assets, property and liabilities to the Queensland Peanut Growers' Co-operative Association Ltd. The Peanut Marketing Board became PMB Australia Ltd and later, in 1997, became the Peanut Company of Australia (PCA).

Since then, the PCA has remained the leading supplier of peanuts in Australia, engaged in researching, growing, storing, processing, value-adding and marketing the product.

The Kingaroy Peanut Silos have been a long-standing symbol, not just of South Burnett and Kingaroy but also of the Queensland peanut industry. Images of the silos have been promulgated since as early as 1938 and remain an easily recognised image in Queensland.

== Description ==
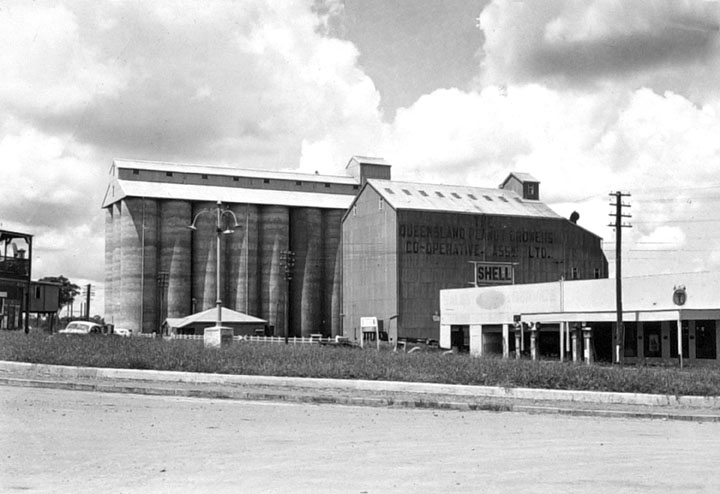
The silos in 1945

The three free-standing silo structures known as Silos Nos 2, 3 and 4 stand prominently on Haly Street, Kingaroy, within the larger Peanut Company of Australia peanut processing plant which occupies a truncated rectangular block bounded by the streets Haly, Jarah and Alford Street East and the Kingaroy/Kilkivan railway line formation. The plant within the silo structures is not considered to be of cultural heritage significance. For effective operation of the silos this plant is replaced and upgraded from time to time.

Extending over eight levels (boot pit, six floors and a gallery), each silo structure consists of nests of storage bins to the north, an elevator tower to the south and accommodates plant associated with the receipt, sorting, feeding, storage and despatch of peanuts. Silo No. 2 incorporates a working house to the south of its elevator tower. Silos Nos 2 and 3 are linked by an overhead enclosed walkway at gallery level. This walkway accommodates a conveyor plant to transport peanuts between the two silos. Elevated loading/despatch platforms sheltered by suspended steel framed awnings stand to the base of tconverthe elevator towers to Silos Nos 3 and 4 and to the east and south sides of the working house to Silo No. 2. The railway tracks of the former siding run between Silos Nos 2 and 3 and are not considered to be of cultural heritage significance.

The white painted concrete and brick silo bins stand on a reinforced concrete floating slab and consist of round bins 20 feet (6.1 metres) in diameter and 85 feet (26 metres) to the top of the cone and interstitial star shape bins 75 feet (23 metres) to the top of the cone. Peanuts are dropped in from a conveyor belt at the gallery level and released from the hoppered base at the ground floor. Silo No. 2, with a capacity of 4,372 long tons (4,442 t) has 24 round and 14 star shape bins, Silo No. 3 has a capacity of 5,200 long tons (5,300 t) in 27 round and 16 star shape bins and number four has a capacity of 2,200 long tons (2,200 t) in 12 round and 6 star shape bins.

The bins in each silo are crowned by a steel-and timber-framed shed clad with metal sheeting and are distinguished by high narrow gabled ridge roofs. Each shed accommodates the gallery space which houses the conveyor belt and associated plant that drops the nuts into the storage bins. A timber-floored platform runs along each side of the conveyor and the space is lit by steel-framed windows to the east, west and north. Hoppers at the base of the bins empty onto conveyor belts that transport the peanuts for despatch.

The elevator towers are steel-and timber-framed, clad with metal sheeting and lit by steel-framed windows to each level. The towers accommodate flights of steel and concrete stairs and the elevator plant associated with hoisting the peanuts from the boot pit to the gallery conveyor belts.

The working house of Silo No. 2 is constructed of reinforced concrete, sheltered by a hipped roof clad with metal sheeting. Banks of steel-framed 12-light windows light each of the five levels. Square in plan, the working house accommodates plant, flights of steel and concrete stairs and a passenger lift with a handsome decorative metal door housed within a weatherboard clad lift shaft.

Many original steel-framed 12-light windows with a fixed louvre vent and a pivoting central section have been retained, notably in the working house and the elevator towers.

== Heritage listing ==
Kingaroy Peanut Silos was listed on the Queensland Heritage Register on 8 October 2010 having satisfied the following criteria.

The place is important in demonstrating the evolution or pattern of Queensland's history.

The Kingaroy Peanut Silos are important in illustrating the large-scale development of the peanut industry in Queensland. Since the 1920s the South Burnett district has been the headquarters of the Queensland peanut industry, a major agricultural industry for the State.

These silos were built in 1938, 1948 and 1951 and reflect the constant growth of the peanut industry in that period.

The Kingaroy Peanut Silos are a striking physical manifestation of the Peanut Company of Australia and its precursor organisations, with the headquarters of the company located in Kingaroy, since 1927. These organisations have controlled and developed the peanut industry in Queensland and Australia since its inception.

The place is important in demonstrating the principal characteristics of a particular class of cultural places.

The intactness, integrity and magnitude of the Kingaroy Peanut Silos, configured in cylindrical and star-shaped bins, and their proximity to the railway line make them an exceptional example of storage silos.

The place is important because of its aesthetic significance.

Standing tall above the Kingaroy skyline these 42 metres (138 ft) high silos dominate the townscape and the landscape of the South Burnett as a landmark visible from great distances. Lit by the rising and setting sun they glow dramatically at dawn and dusk transforming their appearance from functional structure to monumental sculpture.

Their recognition as an aesthetic landmark for the region is evidenced by the use of artistic images of the silos for tourism promotional purposes.

The Kingaroy Peanut Silos are important for their symbolic quality and aesthetic contribution to the South Burnett landscape. The silos are a long-standing and an easily recognised symbol of Kingaroy and have value to the people of south-east Queensland as a distinctive symbol of Kingaroy, the headquarters of the Australian peanut industry.
