= Goondiwindi Civic Centre =

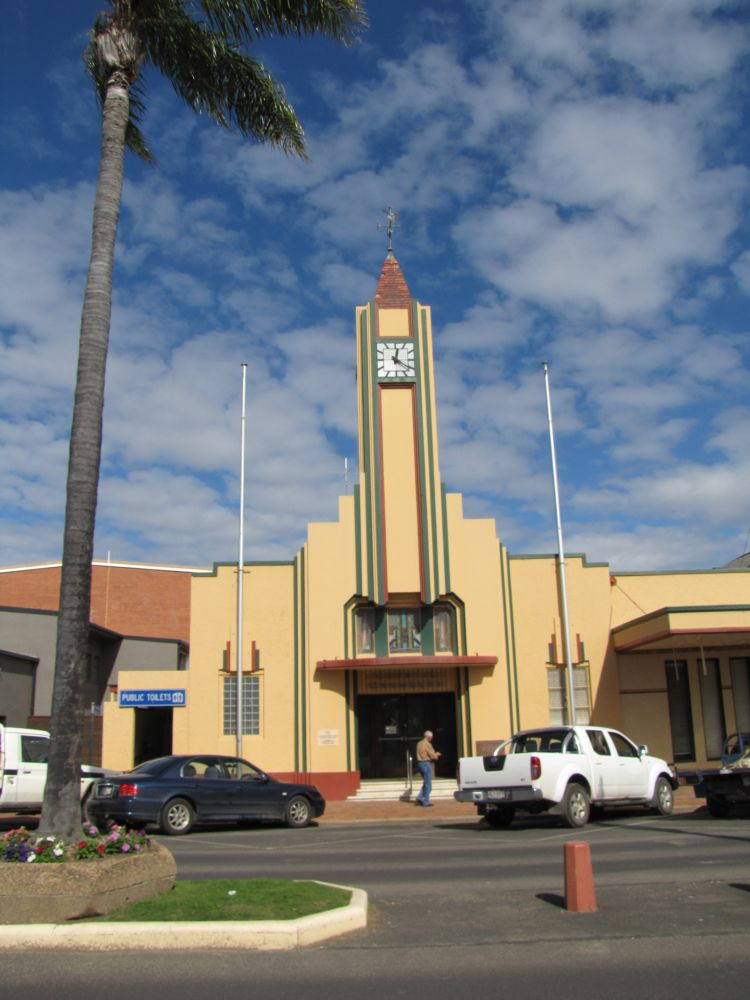
- Goondiwindi Civic Centre, 2012

- Location within Queensland Location within Australia
- 28.5472°S 150.3067°E
- Location: 100 Marshall Street, Goondiwindi, Goondiwindi Region, Queensland, Australia

History
- Design period: 1919–1930s (interwar period)
- Built: 1937
- Built for: Goondiwindi Town Council

Site notes
- Architect: Addison & MacDonald
- Architectural style: Modernism

Queensland Heritage Register
- Official name: Goondiwindi Civic Centre, Council Chambers, Town Hall (Civic Theatre) and Shops
- Type: state heritage (built)
- Designated: 9 July 1993
- Reference no.: 600531
- Significant period: 1930s, 1950s? (fabric); 1930s–1980s (historical, social)
- Significant components: kitchen/kitchen house, auditorium, tower – clock, office/s, shop/s, council chamber/meeting room
- Builders: Thomas Charles Clarke

Goondiwindi Civic Centre is a town hall which is heritage-listed at 100 Marshall Street, Goondiwindi, Goondiwindi Region, Queensland, Australia. It was designed by Addison & MacDonald and built in 1937 by Thomas Charles Clarke, now known as The Clarke Services Group. It is also known as Council Chambers, Town Hall, and Civic Theatre. It was added to the Queensland Heritage Register on 9 July 1993.

== History ==
The Goondiwindi Civic Centre comprises the Town Council Chambers, Town Hall and a set of shops linked by a common facade, in the main street of Goondiwindi. The centre was designed by architects George Frederick Addison and Herbert Stanley MacDonald and built by Thomas Charles Clarke in 1937, and opened by the then Minister for Health and Home Affairs, Mr Ned Hanlon, in 1938.

The centre was built with the assistance of the Queensland Government, with a loan of £10,333 and a subsidy of £5,167. The rents received by the council from the building covered the repayments due by the council, and the loan was repaid by c. 1953.

The Centre replaced the existing Council buildings which were considered unsafe for public use and the School of Arts building which was also in a poor state of repair. The centre was considered an outstanding structure in Goondiwindi, and demonstrated the interest in the steady improvement of the town displayed by previous Councils.

The Council Chambers were substantially altered internally and extended in 1987.

The Town Hall was used as a commercial cinema for a number of years from around 1950 until 1978 and has received intermittent use since then. A new community centre was constructed in Goondiwindi in 1990, which has substantially taken over the function of the Town Hall.

The facade linking the Council Chambers and Town Hall, including the shops, has not been substantially altered since its construction.

== Description ==
The Goondiwindi Civic Centre is a complex of single storeyed rendered masonry buildings with corrugated iron roofs linked by an Art Deco parapeted street facade. The complex consists of the Council Chambers at the eastern end (which incorporates a 1987 blockwork extension to the rear), a row of four shops extending to the west, and an auditorium which is located behind the shops and is separated from the adjacent council chambers by a service courtyard. A kitchen wing extends from the south-eastern corner of the auditorium.

The facade which links the buildings is rendered in a combination of cream-coloured stucco and smooth cement, with vertical elements picked out in rose. It is designed to carefully articulate the hierarchy of and entrances to the three components of the civic centre. The Council Chambers is the primary feature of the facade, with a generous entrance recess with stepped surrounds surmounted by an elegantly proportioned clock tower which can be seen from most locations on Marshall Street. This links to the simple parapet of the adjacent shops, from which a metal awning is suspended. The shopfronts are decorated with mosaic tiles. The entrance to the auditorium is similar to but more modest than that of the Council chambers, and is located between the two easternmost shops.

The entrance to the Council Chambers is framed by a panel in relief with a stepped parapet, and flanked by single rectangular windows. The entrance is shaded by a horizontal semi-circular projecting concrete awning which has a geometrical Art Deco stained glass window inset above. Decorative vertical banding rises above the entrance, continuing past a stepped parapet to form the corners of the clocktower, which has a square clockface, shingle tiled roof and weathervane. The Council Chambers is entered via four etched glass timber doors. The 1987 refurbishment included restoration of much of the original silky oak and walnut joinery.

The shopfronts are decorated with banded ceramic tiling below the display windows, with a fine continuous band decorating the door and window heads. The easternmost display window retains its original timber backing shutters. The awning has a pressed metal soffit with geometric motifs.

The auditorium is entered via a passage between two shops; the entrance is marked with stepped surrounds surmounted by vertical banding in relief, which bear the words "Town Hall". The auditorium has a simple rectangular plan running north–south, with the stage and proscenium at the southern end, and is richly decorated in a blue and rose Art Deco scheme. The walls are rendered masonry with plaster decoration, and the floor is hardwood. The structural bays of the walls are enriched with stepped pilasters and plaster relief panels with geometrical patterns incorporating the letter G. The bays alternately contain timber double doors with decorated steel grilles above, and windows with steel grilles decorated with fountain motifs; these grilles have been partially closed in with rollershutters and timber sheeting, but still provide cross ventilation. Large crystalline stained glass light fittings are located between the openings, and either side of the stage, and a single larger crystalline fitting is centrally placed on the ceiling. The ceiling is sheeted with a gridded pattern in relief and has arrow-head shaped vents. The sheeting at the edge slopes at forty-five degrees, and is finished with a cornice with diamond motifs. The proscenium frames the stage with a gently stepped recess decorated with plaster reliefs moulded into stripes and scrolls. The stage area is flanked by small storage and dressing areas, and the timber roof structure above is exposed. The Art Deco scheme of this interior is both impressive and intact.

The Goondiwindi Civic Centre is a mixed-use Art Deco public building. The intact Art Deco facade is an accomplished design in its skilful expression of the building's mix of uses, makes an important picturesque contribution to the streetscape, and has a landmark element.

In December 2015, the centre was reopened after a $5M redevelopment and renamed the Goondiwindi Regional Civic Centre.

== Heritage listing ==
Goondiwindi Civic Centre was listed on the Queensland Heritage Register on 9 July 1993 having satisfied the following criteria.

The place is important in demonstrating the evolution or pattern of Queensland's history.

Goondiwindi Civic Centre is important in demonstrating the pattern of Queensland's history, in particular the construction of civic buildings for local government purposes during the 1930s.

The place is important in demonstrating the principal characteristics of a particular class of cultural places.

The place is important because of its aesthetic significance.

It is important in demonstrating the principal characteristics of the Art Deco style, and exhibits particular aesthetic characteristics valued by the community: the Art Deco facade is an accomplished design in its skilful articulation of the different functions of and entrances to the building, and makes an important picturesque contribution to the streetscape; the clocktower is a local landmark; and the Art Deco auditorium interior is impressive, containing fine decorative detailing.

The place has a special association with the life or work of a particular person, group or organisation of importance in Queensland's history.

The place has a strong association with the civic work of Brisbane architects GF Addison and HS MacDonald.
