= Shire of Murgon =

Coordinates: 26°14′31.64″S 151°56′28.68″E

- Local government area
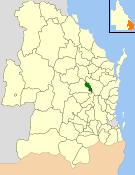
- Location within Queensland

- Country: Australia
- State: Queensland
- Region: South Burnett
- Established: 1914
- Council seat: Murgon

Area
  - Total: 664.7 km^{2} (256.6 sq mi)

Population
  - Total: 3,454 (2006 census)
  - Density: 5.1963/km^{2} (13.4584/sq mi)
- Website: Shire of Murgon
LGAs around Shire of Murgon
Wondai	Gayndah	Kilkivan
Wondai	Shire of Murgon	Kilkivan
Kingaroy	Nanango	Kilkivan

The Shire of Murgon was a local government area in the South Burnett region of Queensland, Australia. The shire covered an area of 664.7 square kilometres (256.6 sq mi), and existed as a local government entity from 1914 until 2008, when it amalgamated with several other councils in the South Burnett area to become the South Burnett Regional Council.

Major activities in the shire include peanuts, dairy farming, beef cattle production and wine.

== History ==
Murgon was initially part of the Barambah Divisional Board which was proclaimed in 1879, and became part of the Kilkivan division when it split away from Barambah in 1888. In 1910, the Shire of Weinholt (now Wondai) split from Kilkivan, and in 1914, parts of the Weinholt and Kilkivan shires formed independently as the Shire of Murgon.

An area of Murgon known as the Cherbourg Aboriginal Settlement, although located entirely within the Shire's boundaries, was functionally separate from the Shire and administered by the Native Affairs Department. On 28 August 1986, a Deed of Grant in Trust was granted to the Cherbourg community, and the Local Government (Community Government Areas) Act 2004 gave Cherbourg formal legal recognition as a local government.

On 15 March 2008, under the Local Government (Reform Implementation) Act 2007 passed by the Parliament of Queensland on 10 August 2007, the Shire of Murgon merged with the Shires of Kingaroy, Wondai and Nanango to form the South Burnett Region. Cherbourg continued to be administered by the separate Cherbourg Aboriginal Shire Council.

== Towns and localities ==
The Shire of Murgon included the following settlements:

- Murgon
- Cloyna
- Moffatdale
- Windera
- Wooroonden

== Chairmen ==
- 1927: Robert Joseph Webster

== Population ==
The following are the census populations given for the years shown. Until the 1971 census, the Australian Bureau of Statistics (ABS) did not count full-blood Aboriginals. As at 2006, almost 10% of the population were Aboriginal, not counting the Cherbourg area. Also, until 1 July 2002, the ABS included the Deed of Grant in Trust councils within the Shire of Murgon statistical local area. Information for the reduced Shire back to 1996 has been provided on the ABS website through the Time Series Profile.

Year	Population
1933	3,663
1947	3,732
1954	4,175
1961	4,530
1966	4,640
1971	4,766
1976	4,556
1981	4,580
1986	4,560
1991	4,470
1996	3,372
2001	3,444
2006	3,454
