= Shire of Kilkivan =

Coordinates: 26°05′08.90″S 152°14′21.53″E

- Local government area
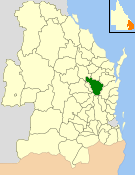
- Location within Queensland

- Country: Australia
- State: Queensland
- Established: 1886 – 15 March 2008
- Council seat: Kilkivan

Area
  - Total: 3,263.4 km^{2} (1,260.0 sq mi)

Population
  - Total: 3,431 (2006 census)
  - Density: 1.05136/km^{2} (2.7230/sq mi)
- Website: Shire of Kilkivan
LGAs around Shire of Kilkivan
Gayndah	Woocoo	Tiaro
Murgon	Shire of Kilkivan	Cooloola
Nanango	Esk	Kilcoy

The Shire of Kilkivan was a local government area about 180 kilometres (112 mi) north-northwest of Brisbane, the state capital of Queensland, Australia. The shire covered an area of 3,263.4 square kilometres (1,260.0 sq mi), and existed from 1886 until its merger with several other local government areas to form the Gympie Region on 15 March 2008.

== History ==
The Kilkivan area was the centre of a gold rush in the late 1860s. As the gold was mined out, agriculture became established in the region.

Kilkivan Division was created on 1 July 1886 from the western part of the Widgee Division and part of the Barambah Division under the Divisional Boards Act 1879. However, the changes to Widgee's boundaries were not welcomed by the Widgee Divisional Board; they felt so much territory had been removed from Widgee Division that it was effectively abolished and the board members all threatened to resign in protest. The government then hastily abolished Kilkivan Division on 30 July 1886, only four weeks after it was created, leading to protests by the residents of Kilkivan. Arguments about boundaries continued for a year. Kilkivan Division was eventually re-constituted on 17 November 1887, comprising part of No. 2 subdivision of Widgee Division and part of the No. 2 subdivision and all of the No. 3 subdivision of Barambah Division, to be governed by a board of six members.

With the passage of the Local Authorities Act 1902, Kilkivan Division became the Shire of Kilkivan on 31 March 1903. The Shire was not subdivided into wards or divisions, and the council consisted of an elected mayor and six councillors.

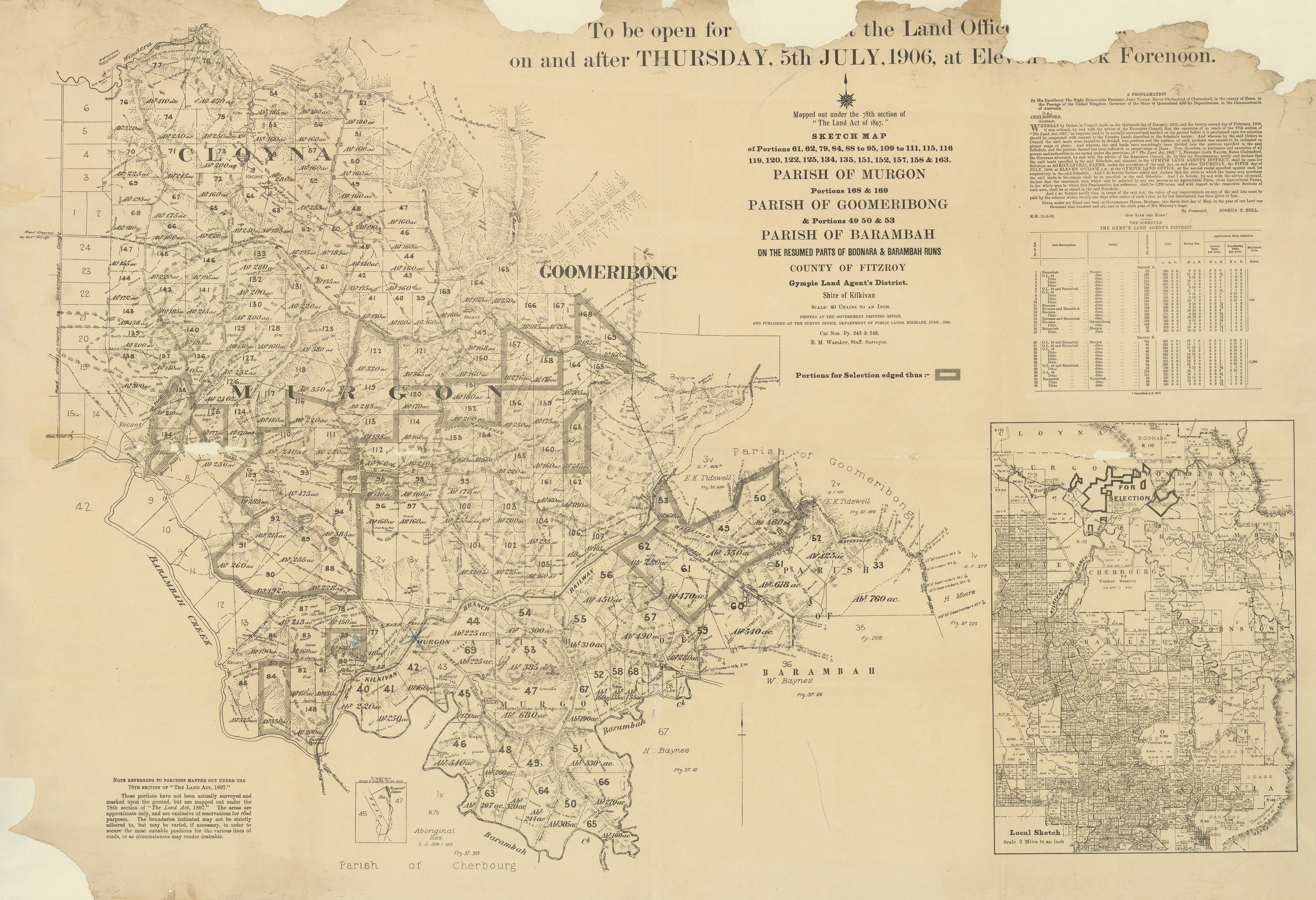
Land sales map, 1906

In July 1906, 32 allotments were advertised for selection by the Department of Public Lands Office. The map advertising the land selection states the allotments are portions in the Parishes of Murgon, Goomeribong and Barambah. The portions were left over from April 5th.

The Kilkivan and District Historical Society was founded in 1979 and established a Shire Museum in Bligh Street, Kilkivan, near the site of a former goldfield. The shire came to host two major annual festivals—the Kilkivan Great Horse Ride in April, and the Goomeri Pumpkin Festival on the last Sunday in May.

On 15 March 2008, under the Local Government (Reform Implementation) Act 2007 passed by the Parliament of Queensland on 10 August 2007, the Shire of Kilikivan merged with the Shire of Cooloola and Division 3 of the Shire of Tiaro (Theebine/Gunalda areas) to form the Gympie Region. At the elections on that day, Kilkivan's mayor, Ron Dyne, became the first mayor of the new council.

== Towns and localities ==
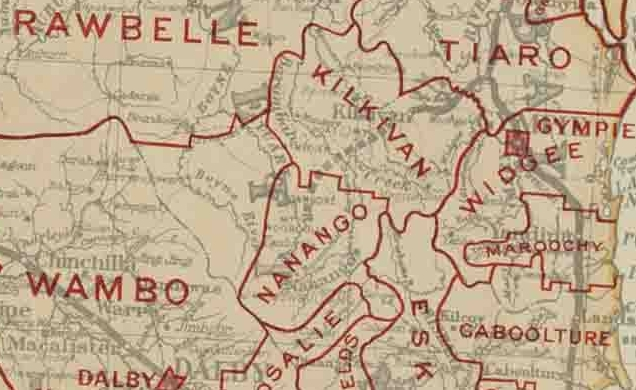
Map of Kilkivan Division and adjacent local government areas, March 1902

The Shire of Kilkivan included the following settlements:

- Kilkivan
- Booubyjan
- Goomeri
- Johnstown
- Kinbombi
- Lower Wonga
- Manumbar
- Tansey
- Widgee
- Woolooga

== Population ==
Year	Population
1921	3,047
1933	4,287
1947	4,141
1954	3,923
1961	3,636
1966	3,345
1971	2,972
1976	2,651
1981	2,500
1986	2,718
1991	2,853
1996	3,203
2001	3,134
2006	3,431

== Chairmen and mayors ==
The following were the leaders of the divisional board and shire council:

- 29 February 1888 – 25 February 1891: George Hall Jones, son of David Jones, the founder of the department store David Jones
- 25 February 1891 – 7 March 1893: J. Broadbent
- 7 March 1893 – 27 June 1893: Llewellyn Mander Jones, nephew of George Hall Jones, and grandson of David Jones
- 27 June 1893 – 2 February 1898: George Hall Jones
- 2 February 1898 – 25 January 1899: William Burnett Lawless
- 25 January 1899 – 28 February 1900: Hugh Moore
- 28 February 1900 – 30 January 1901: Llewellyn Mander Jones
- 30 January 1901 – 26 February 1902: Hugh Moore
- 26 February 1902 – 25 February 1903: Aubrey Edward Jones, another member of the Jones family
- 25 February 1903 – 4 November 1903: James Phillip Voss
- 4 November 1903 – 24 February 1904: William Burnett Lawless
- 24 February 1904 – 30 January 1907: Llewellyn Mander Jones
- 30 January 1907 – 29 January 1908: William Burnett Lawless
- 29 January 1908 – 24 February 1909: James Alexander Slater
- 24 February 1909 – 9 February 1910: Llewellyn Mander Jones
- 9 February 1910 – 8 February 1911: Thomas Holden Tennison
- 8 February 1911 – 31 January 1912: William Burnett Lawless
- 31 January 1912 – 5 February 1913: Norman Jones, another member of the Jones family
- 5 February 1913 – 4 February 1914: Isaac John Moore, brother of Hugh Moore
- 4 February 1914 – 3 February 1915: Frederick Stonard Schollick
- 3 February 1915 – 5 April 1916: Llewellyn Mander Jones
- 5 April 1916 – 4 April 1917: Frederick Stonard Schollick
- 4 April 1917 – 13 February 1918: Isaac John Moore
- 13 February 1918 – 12 February 1919: William Burnett Lawless
- 12 February 1919 – 3 August 1921: Frederick Stonard Schollick
- 3 August 1921 – 4 May 1927: William Burnett Lawless
- 4 May 1927 – May 1930: John Edward Stanton
- May 1930 – May 1933: Robert Pride Stumm
- May 1933 – May 1936: John Edward Stanton
- May 1936 – May 1943: Thomas Herbert Spencer
- May 1943 – April 1970: Charles Clarence Jones
- April 1970 – 1994: Alec Frederick McIntosh
- 1994–2004: David Lahiff
- 2004–2008: Ron Dyne
