= Taabinga =

Taabinga may refer to:

- Taabinga, Queensland, a town in the South Burnett Region, Australia
- Taabinga Homestead, a heritage-listed homestead in Haly Creek, South Burnett Region, Australia
