= Dangore, Queensland =

Dangore
- Suburb
- Interactive map of Dangore
- Coordinates: 26.4627°S 151.5880°E
- Country: Australia
- State: Queensland
- LGA: South Burnett Region
- Location: 40.6 km (25.2 mi) WNW of Kingaroy; 149 km (93 mi) WSW of Gympie; 179 km (111 mi) N of Toowoomba; 261 km (162 mi) NW of Brisbane

Government
  - State electorate: Nanango
  - Federal division: Maranoa

Area
  - Total: 162.9 km^{2} (62.9 sq mi)

Population
  - Total: 35 (2021 census)
  - Density: 0.2149/km^{2} (0.556/sq mi)
- Time zone: UTC+10:00 (AEST)
- Postcode: 4610
Suburbs around Dangore
Ballogie	Ballogie	Gordonbrook
Chahpingah	Dangore	Gordonbrook
Chahpingah	Mannuem	Wattle Grove

Dangore is a rural locality in the South Burnett Region, Queensland, Australia. In the 2021 census, Dangore had a population of 35 people.

== Geography ==
The Kingaroy Burrandowan Road forms the southern boundary of the locality.

Dangore Mountain is in the north-east of the locality (26.4568°S 151.6057°E) rising to 601 metres (1,972 ft) above sea level.

Dangore State Forest is in the north of the locality. Apart from this protected area, the land use is predominantly grazing on native vegetation.

== History ==
Dangore was the name of an early pastoral lease, held in 1865 by R. Campbell.

== Demographics ==
In the 2016 census, Dangore had a population of 35 people.

In the 2021 census, Dangore had a population of 35 people.

== Education ==
There are no schools in Dangore. The nearest government primary schools are Tingoora State School in Tingoora to the north-east, Crawford State School in Crawford to the east, and Kumbia State School in Kumbia to the south-east. The nearest government secondary schools are Proston State School (to Year 10) in Proston to the north, Wondai State School (to Year 10) in Wondai to the north-east, and Kingaroy State High School (to Year 12) in Kingaroy to the east.

There are also Catholic and Lutheran schools in Kingaroy.
