= Wattle Grove =

Wattle Grove may be:

- Wattle Grove, New South Wales, Australia
- Wattle Grove, Queensland, a locality in the South Burnett Region, Queensland, Australia
- Wattle Grove, Tasmania, Australia
- Wattle Grove, Western Australia
