= Kingaroy Airport =

- IATA: KGY; ICAO: YKRY

Summary
- Airport type: Public
- Operator: South Burnett Regional
- Location: Taabinga, adjacent to Kingaroy, Queensland
- Elevation AMSL: 1,492 ft / 455 m
- Coordinates: 26°34′41″S 151°50′22″E

Map
- Location in Queensland

Runways
| Direction | Length | | Surface |
| Direction | m | ft | Surface |
|---|---|---|---|
| 16/34 | 1,600 | 5,249 | Asphalt |
| 05/23 | 1,303 | 4,275 | Grass/Brown silt clay |
- Sources: Australian AIP and aerodrome chart

Kingaroy Airport or Sir Joh Bjelke-Petersen Airport (IATA: KGY, ICAO: YKRY) is an airport located 2.5 nautical miles (4.6 km; 2.9 mi) south of Kingaroy, Queensland, Australia.

== History ==
The airport opened in 1931 as Kingaroy Aerodrome. It was taken over by the Royal Australian Air Force in October 1941 as Landing Ground No. 375 and formally acquired by the Commonwealth government in June 1943, becoming RAAF Station Kingaroy. Four runways and 180 buildings were constructed between July 1942 and May 1943. It was downgraded to an unstaffed Emergency Landing Ground in June 1945 and returned to civilian control in July 1946. On 17 March, 1949, Minister for Air C. F. Adermann suggested that Kingaroy Airport should act as an alternative landing ground to Eagle Farm Airport in Brisbane if the Brisbane airports were ever closed. The minister was investigating the sustainability of this role. One hangar was purchased by the Air Board, with other hangars retained by Civil Aviation.

== Current facilities ==
There are two runways, the main is 16/34 and is 1,600 m × 30 m (5,249 ft × 98 ft), paved and the second, 05/23, is 1,303 m × 30 m (4,275 ft × 98 ft), grass. There are no scheduled services but the airport is used by charter flights to the gas fields in far west Queensland.

The airport is used for gliding.

== See also ==
- List of airports in Queensland
