= Gordonbrook, Queensland =

Gordonbrook
- Suburb
- Interactive map of Gordonbrook
- Coordinates: 26.4691°S 151.7155°E
- Country: Australia
- State: Queensland
- LGA: South Burnett Region
- Location: 11.8 km (7.3 mi) W of Kingaroy; 109 km (68 mi) NE of Dalby; 160 km (99 mi) N of Toowoomba; 223 km (139 mi) NW of Brisbane

Government
  - State electorate: Nanango
  - Federal divisions: Flynn; Maranoa

Area
  - Total: 202.8 km^{2} (78.3 sq mi)

Population
  - Total: 184 (2021 census)
  - Density: 0.9073/km^{2} (2.350/sq mi)
- Time zone: UTC+10:00 (AEST)
- Postcode: 4610
Suburbs around Gordonbrook
Ballogie; Wilkesdale	Wooroolin	Memerambi
Dangore	Gordonbrook	Crawford
Wattle Grove	Inverlaw	Kingaroy

Gordonbrook is a rural locality in the South Burnett Region, Queensland, Australia. In the 2021 census, Gordonbrook had a population of 184 people.

== Geography ==
Gordonbrook mainly consists of grazing land, with irrigated crops growing close to the banks of the Stuart River. The Stuart River dissects the locality, with the large artificial lake, the Lake Gordonbrook damming the river in the northern part of the district. Very little of the area is developed with most of the land covered by bush and grazing land. Reedy Creek, a tributary of Stuart River downstream of Gordonbrook Dam, is another major waterway in the locality.

== History ==
Gordonbrook was one of the districts used for soldier settlements after World War I. In February 1920, an initial total of 5,038 hectares (12,450 acres) were divided in 25 land parcels offered up for selection by returned soldiers and the general public. Although it was recommended that the settlers grow cotton, most took up dairying. By June 1923 there were 29 settlers in the scheme but by 1929 only 13 remained.

Gordon Brook Provisional School opened in 1924. On 11 September 1928 Gordon Brook South Provisional School opened and both schools operated "half time" (the full-time teacher being split between them). In 1929, Gordon Brook Provisional School closed and Gordon Brook South Provisional School continued on a full-time basis. On 1 October 1938 it became Gordon Brook South State School and then closed in 1945.

In 1941 Gordonbrook Dam was constructed to provide the town of Kingaroy and its former WWII airforce base, R.A.A.F Kingaroy with a reliable water supply. In 1986, the dam was extensively upgraded, including the raising of the dam wall and spillway by two metres.

Formerly in the Shire of Kingaroy, Gordonbrook was included in the newly formed South Burnett Region following the local government amalgamations in March 2008.

== Demographics ==
In the 2011 census, Gordonbrook had a population of 322 people.

In the 2016 census, Gordonbrook had a population of 175 people.

In the 2021 census, Gordonbrook had a population of 184 people.

== Education ==
There are no schools in Gordonbrook. The nearest government primary schools are:

- Crawford State School in neighbouring Crawford to the east
- Kingaroy State School in neighbouring Kingaroy to the south-east
- Kumbia State School in Kumbia to the south
- Wooroolin State School in neighbouring Wooroolin to the north-east
- Tingoora State School in Tingoora to the north-east

The nearest government secondary school is Kingaroy State High School in Kingaroy.

== Economy ==
There are a number of homesteads in the area, including:

- Brigadoon (26.5370°S 151.7377°E)
- Brigadoon (26.5403°S 151.7300°E)
- Gordonbrook (26.4324°S 151.7153°E)
- Gunna Hafta (26.5146°S 151.7471°E)
- Hillgrove (26.5450°S 151.7697°E)
- Langfaulds (26.5004°S 151.7217°E)
- Plain View (26.5113°S 151.6404°E)
- Tamalba (26.5127°S 151.7731°E)
- Wyuna (26.5065°S 151.6717°E)
