= Benair, Queensland =

Benair
- Suburb
- Interactive map of Benair
- Coordinates: 26.6233°S 151.6983°E
- Country: Australia
- State: Queensland
- LGA: South Burnett Region
- Location: 19.9 km (12.4 mi) SW of Kingaroy; 91.1 km (56.6 mi) NE of Dalby; 149 km (93 mi) N of Toowoomba; 234 km (145 mi) NW of Brisbane

Government
  - State electorate: Nanango
  - Federal division: Maranoa

Area
  - Total: 56.6 km^{2} (21.9 sq mi)

Population
  - Total: 151 (2021 census)
  - Density: 2.668/km^{2} (6.910/sq mi)
- Time zone: UTC+10:00 (AEST)
- Postcode: 4610
Suburbs around Benair
Wattle Grove	Wattle Grove	Inverlaw
Mannuem	Benair	Inverlaw
Mannuem	Kumbia	Haly Creek

Benair is a rural locality in the South Burnett Region, Queensland, Australia. In the 2021 census, Benair had a population of 151 people.

== Geography ==
The Bunya Highway enters the locality from the south (Kumbia) and exits to the north-east (Inverlaw).

The land use is a mixture of crop growing and grazing on native vegetation.

== History ==
The Benair area opened for settlement circa 1914.

Boonare State School opened on 31 July 1911 but was renamed Benair State School later that year. It closed on 9 December 1977. It was at 433 Benair Road (26.64256°S 151.70587°E).

Reedy Creek Provisional School opened in 1911 as a half-time school in conjunction with Mannuem Creek Provisional School (meaning the two schools shared a single teacher). It closed on 30 September 1912. On 27 July 1916, it reopened as Reedy Creek State School. It closed in 1963. It was at 993 Reedy Creek Road (26.60932°S 151.65045°E).

A Lutheran church congregation formed in 1917 and erected St Paul's Lutheran Church with an associated cemetery in 1921 at 8965 Bunya Highway (26.6473°S 151.6967°E). In 1950 a new church was built. In 1958 a church hall was added by relocated by relocating a former army building from Gregory Terrace in Brisbane. The church closed in 1977 and the church building was relocated to become a chapel at Mount Tamborine. After the church closed, the site became known as the Peace Lutheran Hall and Cemetery. Although listed on the South Burnett Local Heritage Register, approval to demolish the hall was given in 2017 but the cemetery had to be preserved.

== Demographics ==
In the 2016 census, Benair had a population of 144 people.

In the 2021 census, Benair had a population of 151 people.

== Education ==
There are no schools in Benair. The nearest government primary schools are Kumbia State School in neighbouring Kumbia to the south and Taabinga State School in Kingaroy to the north-east. The nearest government secondary school is Kingaroy State High School, also in Kingaroy.
