= Wattle Grove, Queensland =

Wattle Grove Queensland
- Coordinates: 26.5669°S 151.6747°E
- Population: 100 (2021 census)
  - Density: 1.4/km^{2} (3.7/sq mi)
- Postcode(s): 4610
- Area: 69.3 km^{2} (26.8 sq mi)
- Time zone: AEST (UTC+10:00)
- Location: 16.4 km (10 mi) W of Kingaroy; 166 km (103 mi) N of Toowoomba; 225 km (140 mi) NW of Brisbane
- LGA(s): South Burnett Region
- State electorate(s): Nanango
- Federal division(s): Maranoa
Suburbs around Wattle Grove:
Gordonbrook	Gordonbrook	Gordonbrook
Dangore	Wattle Grove	Inverlaw
Mannuem	Benair	Benair

Wattle Grove is a rural locality in the South Burnett Region, Queensland, Australia. In the 2021 census, Wattle Grove had a population of 100 people.

== History ==
Wattle Grove State School opened on 17 May 1915 and closed on 31 December 1963. It was on a 3-acre (1.2 ha) site at 754 Wooden Hut Road (north-east corner of Wattlegrove Road, 26.57614°S 151.69649°E).

== Demographics ==
In the 2016 census, Wattle Grove had a population of 86 people.

In the 2021 census, Wattle Grove had a population of 100 people.

== Education ==
There are no schools in Wattle Grove. The nearest government primary schools are Kumbia State School in Kumbia to the south and Kingaroy State School in Kingaroy to the east. The nearest government secondary school is Kingaroy State High School, also in Kingaroy. There are also non-government schools in Kingaroy.
