= Haly Creek, Queensland =

Haly Creek
- Suburb
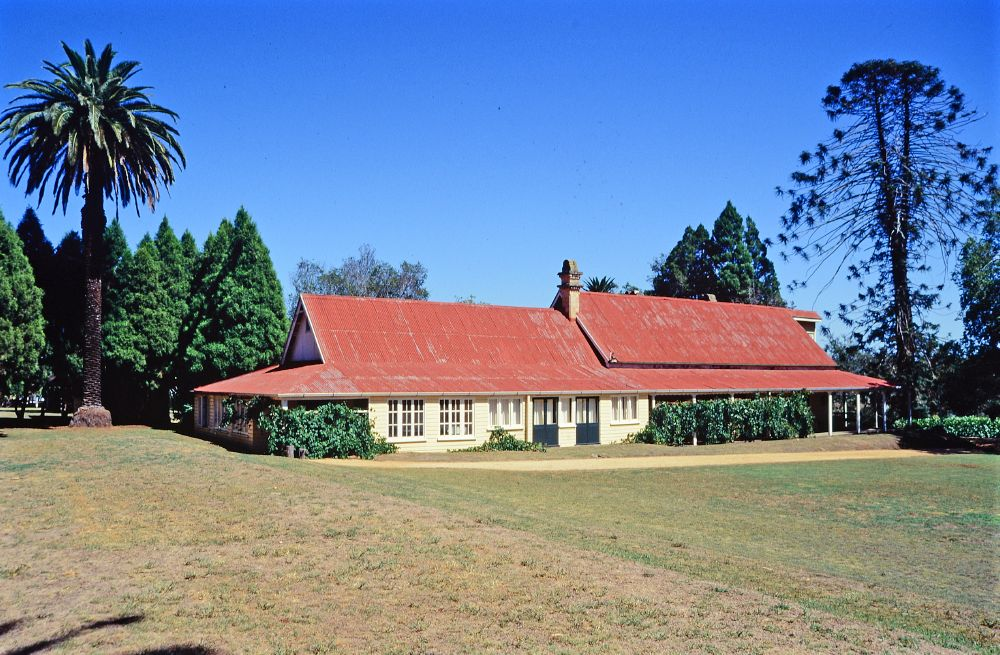
- Taabinga Homestead, 2002

- Interactive map of Haly Creek
- Coordinates: 26.6949°S 151.7261°E
- Country: Australia
- State: Queensland
- LGA: South Burnett Region
- Location: 24.5 km (15.2 mi) SSW of Kingaroy; 145 km (90 mi) N of Toowoomba; 229 km (142 mi) NW of Brisbane

Government
  - State electorate: Nanango
  - Federal division: Maranoa

Area
  - Total: 74.7 km^{2} (28.8 sq mi)
- Elevation: 450–520 m (1,480–1,710 ft)

Population
  - Total: 124 (2021 census)
  - Density: 1.660/km^{2} (4.299/sq mi)
- Time zone: UTC+10:00 (AEST)
- Postcode: 4610
Suburbs around Haly Creek
Benair	Inverlaw	Goodger
Kumbia	Haly Creek	Brooklands
Alice Creek	Alice Creek	Ellesmere

Haly Creek is a rural locality in the South Burnett Region, Queensland, Australia. In the 2021 census, Haly Creek had a population of 124 people.

Boonyouin is a neighbourhood in the locality (26.7°S 151.7166°E).

== Geography ==
Haly Creek flows from the south-west to the north of the locality where it enters the Stuart River, which forms the western boundary of the locality. The land is mostly flat at about 450 metres above sea level but with elevations rising to 520 metres. The land is almost entirely used for agriculture with crops dominating in the north of the locality and grazing in the south.

== History ==
The locality is named after the creek of the same name which is in turn named after Charles Robert Haly who established the Taabinga Station in the district.

In August 1909, two acres were reserved for school purposes. The school was built by Remhart and Bonding for £216/18/-. Haly's Creek State School opened in 1910, being renamed Haly Creek State School in 1911. It closed in 1967. It was located at 299 Ellesmere Road (26.67955°S 151.75517°E).

A postal receiving office opened at Haly Creek on 10 August 1912 but closed on 16 December 1924, reopening on 1 July 1925. A post office opened on 1 July 1927 and closed on 3 March 1955.

Taabinga Road State School opened circa August 1924, but was renamed Boonyouin State School on 1 November 1924. It closed in 1953. It was located on 2-acre (0.81 ha) site on the western side of Flagstone Creek Road (approx 26.7033°S 151.7107°E).

== Demographics ==
In the 2011 census, Haly Creek had a population of 235 people.

In the 2016 census, Haly Creek had a population of 136 people.

In the 2021 census, Haly Creek had a population of 124 people.

== Heritage listings ==
Haly Creek has a number of heritage-listed sites, including:

- Taabinga Homestead, 7 Old Taabinga Road (26.6545°S 151.7503°E)

== Education ==
There are no schools in Haly Creek. The nearest government primary schools are Kumbia State School in neighbouring Kumbia to the west and Taabinga State School in Kingaroy to the north-east. The nearest government secondary school is Kingaroy State High School in Kingaroy to the north.

== Economy ==
There are a number of homesteads in the locality:

- Abergeldie (26.7053°S 151.6980°E)
- Boonyouin (26.7018°S 151.7099°E)
- Chatterly (26.6687°S 151.7798°E)
- Dalmaney (26.7172°S 151.6899°E)
- Ivy Home (26.6648°S 151.7153°E)
- Merlwood (26.6919°S 151.7701°E)
- Shangri-La (26.6697°S 151.7460°E)
- Stuartlea (26.6397°S 151.7726°E)
- The Oaks (26.6732°S 151.7468°E)
- Woohanga (26.6555°S 151.7671°E)
- Woohanga (26.6591°S 151.7602°E)
