= Taabinga Homestead =

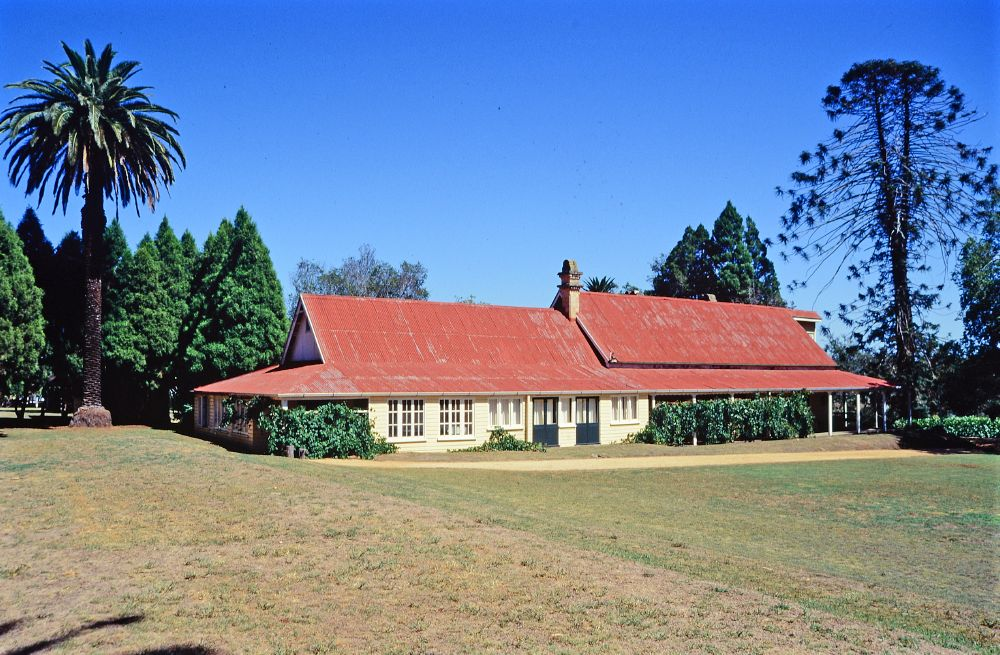
- Taabinga Homestead, 2002

- Location within Queensland
- 26.6545°S 151.7503°E
- Location: 7 Old Taabinga Road, Haly Creek, South Burnett Region, Queensland, Australia

History
- Design period: 1840s–1860s (mid-19th century)
- Built: 1840s–1910

Queensland Heritage Register
- Official name: Taabinga Homestead
- Type: state heritage (built, landscape)
- Designated: 21 October 1992
- Reference no.: 600647
- Significant period: 1840s–1850s (historical); 1840s–1910s (fabric)
- Significant components: out building/s, garden/grounds, kitchen/kitchen house, tennis court, meat house, graveyard, stables, residential accommodation – main house, dairy/creamery, garage, chimney/chimney stack

Taabinga Homestead is a heritage-listed homestead at 7 Old Taabinga Road, Haly Creek, South Burnett Region, Queensland, Australia. It was built from 1846 to 1864. It was added to the Queensland Heritage Register on 21 October 1992.

The homestead is the main building of Taabinga Station, and now operates as a homestay, providing bed and breakfast accommodation to tourists, as well as regular farm tours.

== History ==
The Taabinga run was originally taken up by the Haly brothers in the 1840s and the main residence was developed during the 1840s and 1850s. Most of the outbuildings on the homestead site were built during the 1890s and early 1900s when Arthur Youngman was owner of the property.

The explorations of Henry Stuart Russell in the Burnett district during the early 1840s mark a watershed in the pastoral history of Queensland. Following the closure of Moreton Bay as a penal colony, Russell led the search for land north of Brisbane and the Darling Downs. He first arrived in Queensland in 1840 to stay with cousins on the Darling Downs and by 1842 he was the first European to pass through what was later to become Taabinga. Russell's expeditions in the Burnett had opened a district of rich grazing and agricultural land, and in 1843 he took up Burrandowan run on the Borne River as a sheep station.

Other squatters soon followed Russell and it was brothers Charles Robert and William O'Grady Haly who first settled on Taabinga station. The Haly brothers had arrived in Australia from Newfoundland in 1838 and settled on the Hunter River before moving to the Gwydir River. From there they assembled a team of men and some 5,000 sheep and travelled north through the Logan district during the early 1840s in search of land. Shearing records indicate the Haly brothers had settled Taabinga station by 1846, at which time it was an established sheep property covering 305 square miles. Despite their early occupation of the land, the Haly brothers did not apply for a lease over Taabinga until June 1850, which was granted on 10 February 1852 for a term of 14 years. By 1853, Charles Haly was at Tamrookum in the Logan district, where he married Rosa Harpur and was to remain until at least 1854. During this time it is most likely that either William Haly or a superintendent was managing Taabinga station. When William Haly returned to England in 1859, Charles became sole lessee of Taabinga and the following year was elected to the first Queensland Legislative Assembly as the member for the Burnett. In 1863 he acquired a freehold over 314 acres of the run and remained at the property until 1875 when he moved to Dalby.

While documentary evidence for the physical development of Taabinga is non-existent, Hector Munro, who was the son of George Munro, onetime manager of Boondooma station, and who was a friend of the Haly family, described the first structure at Taabinga as a hut:

"built with bark, then perpendicular slabs with a ground floor and bark roof. The house known as the Boss's residence was built with pit saw and timber foundation logs of wood, squared on one side with walls of horizontal slabs and floor in boards of pit saw and roof shingles".

From these rudimentary structures the homestead site gained more permanent buildings. It is claimed that the first part of the main residence, which still stands today, was constructed during the 1840s and was developed through to the 1850s. According to the Alford family, who later acquired Taabinga and whose papers have been published as Alford Family Notes, Charles Haly began residing at Taabinga with his family in the late 1850s, just prior to becoming sole lessee of the property. An article in The Queenslander in 1924 indicates the continued development of the homestead site in this period: "Sixty-seven years ago where now stands this beautiful, and complete home, was little better than wild, crude bush". The freeholding of a portion of the Taabinga run by Charles Haly in 1863 would seem to indicate the existence of the main residence by this time. Its western wall is built from locally quarried sandstone and the cedar was obtained from the Bunya Mountains while the timber for the hardwood floors was taken from the property itself. At much the same time that the main residence was being constructed it is believed that the Halys also built the stockyards and stables. The stables, which remain well preserved, are located on an adjoining lot, however the stockyards were damaged in a fire during the 1950s.

On 27 March 1875, Charles Haly was preparing to sell his interests in Taabinga and the Brisbane Courier reported he had "received what is considered a good offer . . . and it is not unlikely that the station may shortly change hands". Two months later the Brisbane Courier reported that Taabinga, with some 3,000 head of stock, was just about "ready to hand over. A short time after, it is understood, Mr Haly and family will take their departure from the station". By October 1875, James Henderson, Boulton Molineaux and Thomas Littlejohn had acquired both the leasehold and freehold portions of Taabinga. The following year the leasehold was transferred to Thomas Littlejohn and Thomas Alford, and Richard Symes Alford, brother of Thomas, was charged with managing the property. Thomas Alford was originally from Drayton and by the mid-1870s had an interest in Coochin Coochin station, where he lived, as well as Gwambagwine station. At the time of Haly's departure from Taabinga station both sheep and cattle were on the run, but Alford's prime interest in the property was in expanding the cattle breeding programmes of Coochin Coochin and Gwambagwine. In 1883, Thomas was registered as the sole owner of the leasehold and freehold portions of Taabinga and moved there to live after his brother, Richard, relinquished the position as manager of the station. Thomas remained at Taabinga until a riding accident in 1887 forced him to sell his interests in the estate.

Arthur Youngman, who was a close friend of Richard Symes Alford, took up the leasehold and freehold portions of Taabinga in 1888 from Thomas Alford. Youngman was born in Melbourne in 1862 and after an abortive attempt to study medicine he moved to Queensland to work as a jackaroo. He was relatively inexperienced at pastoral life, having gained his first taste at Rawbelle station before purchasing Taabinga, but benefited from the continued employment of John William Walters who had served as head stockman at Taabinga since the mid-1870s. Youngman was also able to call on Richard Symes Alford to return to Taabinga as a bookkeeper. Youngman built a house, once known as The Lodge, to accommodate Alford and his family, but this was not the only improvement made to the property during Youngman's time there. An article on Youngman in the Queensland Trustees Quarterly Review in March 1951 noted that when "he first took possession of Taabinga he began to improve the property by a policy of ringbarking the heavily-timbered country, by the planting of artificial grasses . . . and by subdividing the large paddocks into smaller and more workable areas".

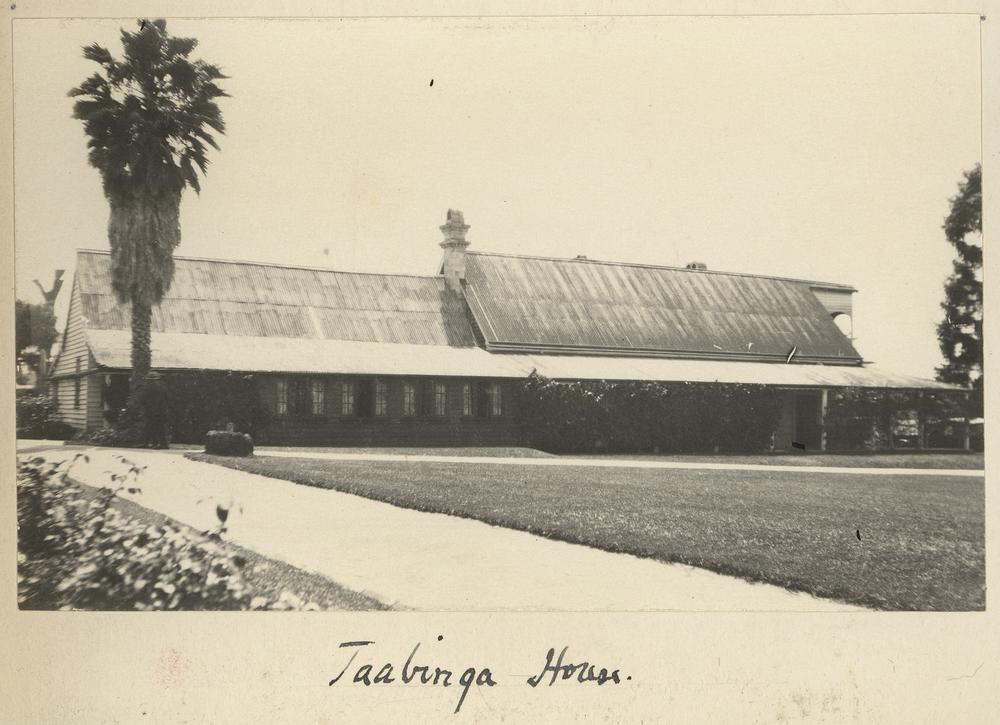
Taabinga Homestead, circa 1927

A programme of rebuilding and renovation during the 1890s and early 1900s resulted in the homestead being modernized and expanded, as noted in The Queenslander in 1924: "Modern in all comforts and conveniences, the home (which has been added to of late years) is distinctly charming in its simple, old-fashioned architecture". Most of the outbuildings also date from Youngman's time at Taabinga and they remain in a well-conserved state as part of the homestead complex. These include a garage, store and meat house for which Brisbane architects HW Atkinson and Charles McLay called tenders in March 1909. Similarly, the gardens that surround the main residence are today a reminder of Youngman's improvements to Taabinga. The Brisbane Courier in 1932 described the gardens as "one of the most glorious . . . that any one could possibly wish to see. In it Mr Youngman has personally expended much energy, and he has every reason to be proud of his achievement".

While the homestead block remained unaffected, the increasing demand for land in the Burnett district had reduced the Taabinga run during Youngman's time there. Early resumptions had occurred during Thomas Alford's tenure, reducing the size of the leased land from the original 305 square miles to 154 square miles at the time of Youngman's succession. Further resumptions occurred in 1901 and 1907, and in August 1911 the government resumed the whole of the run under the Crown Land Act of 1897. Youngman was compensated £11,745 being the value of the resumed land, improvements and legal costs.

Youngman remained at Taabinga until his death in 1935. He was buried in the cemetery located within the homestead complex, and title to the property was held in trust by Frederick Septimus Lee, Queensland Trustees and Youngman's wife, Florence Daphne Youngman. In 1958, Roderick Gordon Graham replaced Lee as one of the trustees of the estate and following Graham's death in 1961 Dorothy Foster McWilliam was appointed in his place. When Daphne Youngman died in 1975 her remains were buried in a plot next to her husband on the homestead site. The property was further subdivided in the 1980s, with the homestead portion remaining in the Youngman family and operated as a professional homestay.

== Description ==
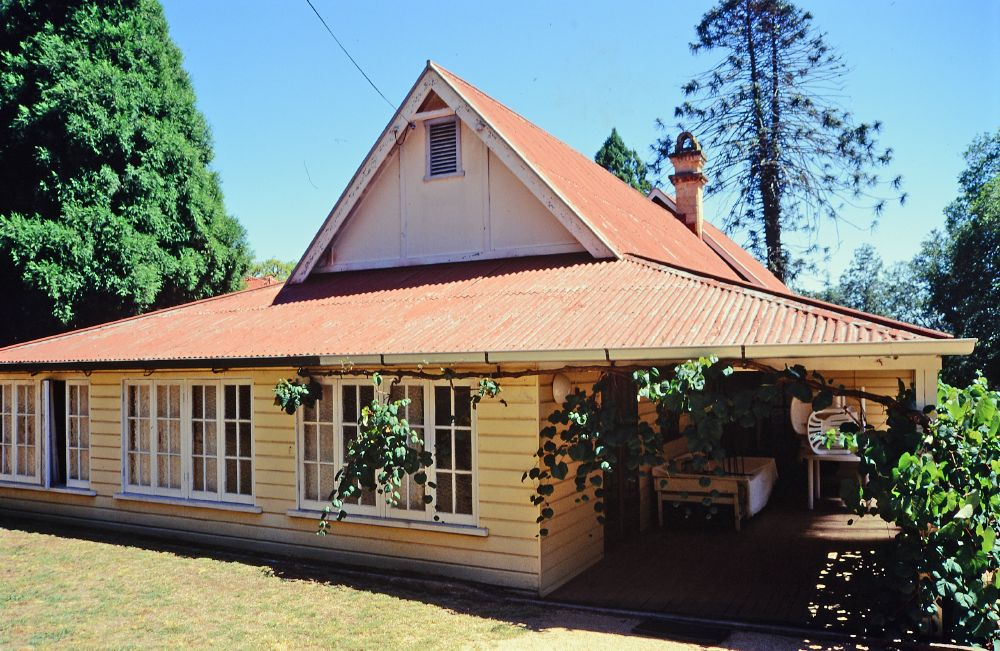
Side view, 2002

The Taabinga Homestead Complex is situated on Old Taabinga Road, off the Bunya Highway about 11 kilometres (6.8 mi) north-east of Kumbia and 15 kilometres (9.3 mi) south-west of Kingaroy. It consists of a main homestead building, a number of associated outbuildings, the remnants of an extensive, carefully tended garden, a tennis court, and a small cemetery. The outbuildings include a kitchen, dairy, meat house, carpenter/blacksmith's workshop, and grain store, as well as garages, cottages, and stables. The main approach to the complex, and the front face of the property, is from the east. The outbuildings have been located in a zone to the west behind the homestead building.

=== House ===
The single-storey house is made of two gable-roofed sections, with broken-back extensions. Together they form a long, rectangular plan shape, the long sides of which are oriented toward the east and west. The northern section of the house is wider than the other by approximately 2 metres (6 ft 7 in). This additional width extends to the west, on the rear elevation. The roof to the southern section of the house is slightly lower than the other, though its steep pitch is the same. A broken-back skirt of roof is created on its three exposed sides. On the eastern elevation, the long plane of roof set at a secondary pitch continues past the northern segment of the house, making a separate verandah roof. This roof bends to meet the wall of the first storey lookout, which nestles under the high ridge of the gable roof. A sandstone chimneystack projects from the site where the two main gable roofs join, near their ridgelines. Two sandstone chimneystacks project through the line where the roof changes pitch on the western side of the northern section of the house. On this elevation, where the two parts meet, the roof to the northern section is stepped back. This marks a narrow corridor and stair that separates the two sections. All roof planes are clad in corrugated iron, and unless otherwise stated this is the case with the roofs of other buildings in the complex.

A large proportion of the exterior walls to the northern section of the house are constructed of sandstone ashlar that is approximately 60 centimetres (24 in) deep. The sills and flat arches to windows and doors in these walls are also made of sandstone. The windows on the western elevation are timber-framed casements with a total of 3 lights in each sash, while the doors are five-panelled. In the short corridor between the two sections of the house, the ashlar is topped with weatherboard cladding. The exterior walls to the east and north-facing verandah areas are clad in wide chamferboards and have exposed timber framing. The northern gable end of this section of the house, and its first-storey lookout are clad in weatherboards. The lookout is open to the east and north, and its rails and balusters are timber. Fitted above these, framing each view, are simple, single-board timber brackets and valances. The verandah roof is supported by a series of square timber posts, which have simple timber capitals and are scored on their outward-facing sides. A scalloped fascia runs the length of the verandah roof's edge. The sloping ceiling to the verandah is lined with single-beaded, tongue-and-groove boards, while the floor is clad in shot-edge timber boards. Each double door opening onto the verandah has a low waist, 4 lights in each leaf, and a 2-paned fanlight.

The exterior walls to the southern section of the house are largely clad in chamferboards, except for a small section on the western facade, which is clad in wide, vertical timber slabs. A square verandah area occupies the south-east corner of this section of the house. The windows on the eastern facade are casements, except for a fixed pane of glass separating two double doors with upper lights. Two large windows on the southernmost end of this elevation have low sills when compared with the remaining ones. They each have three sashes, which are then divided into 6 lights. The remaining casement windows each have three sashes with only single lights. On the southern facade, the three windows match those described as having comparatively low sill heights, except they feature four sashes rather than three. A wide section of the western facade steps back towards the interior of the structure, separating the chamferboard and slab claddings. This stepped section is clad in wide, vertical timber boards.

=== House Interior ===
The southern section of the house is divided into two large rooms by a timber bi-fold door. The ceiling is coved and lined with tongue-and- groove timber boards. A long timber beam supported by timber posts supports the change in pitch of the roof. The single fireplace has a timber mantel and the wall it opens out of appears to be plastered.

The northern section of the house is divided into a number of rooms. Two large ones abut the eastern verandah, sit under the main gable, and are divided by a set of 6-panel timber bi-fold doors. Each room has a fireplace with a simple timber mantelpiece and curved back. The walls are lined with fibrous cement sheeting, which have beaded joints. They were originally lined with paper on hessian. The walls of the chimneys are painted stone. The ceilings are lined with wide, single-beaded tongue-and-groove boards, with timber cornices. Under the secondary pitch of the roof, facing west, there are a number of bedrooms. A corridor, parallel with the stairs, is situated at the southern end of this wing. It allows entry to the larger rooms behind.

It is believed that the stairs situated between the two parts of the house, lead to a corridor running under the main ridge to the upper storey lookout.

=== Kitchen ===
The kitchen building is located a few metres to the west of the sandstone section of the house, with a gable-roofed walkway connecting the two. It has a hipped roof with broken-back wings along the northern and southern sides. The ridgeline runs perpendicular to that of the house's gable roofs. The exterior walls are clad in a combination of vertical slabs and weatherboards. On the eastern facade is a double-hung sash window with hand-drawn glass, and on the opposite facade there is a bank of casements, possibly dating from late 1900s to early 1920s. To the south, a square open section, occupies the middle of the kitchen's slab facade. A single board door opens onto the interior from here. A french door with 8 lights in each sash opens off the kitchen onto a semi-enclosed verandah area on the northern facade. On the interior, the floors are covered with linoleum, the walls are lined with wide, single-beaded tongue-and-groove boards, and the ceiling is unlined, revealing the original shingles. The roof beams are adzed and the battens are pit-sawn.

=== Dairy ===
The dairy is located about 10 metres (33 ft) to the west of the house and 7 metres (23 ft) to the south of the kitchen building. It has a high-pitched pyramid roof clad in tiles (scale), the deep overhang of which is supported by simple timber braces. The sloping eaves are lined with wide, single-beaded tongue-and-groove boards. On the exterior, the walls are clad to sill-height with weatherboards, and above this with panels of galvanised metal louvres set in timber frames. The square-plan structure sits on a concrete slab-on-ground, and 2 ventilation blocks are fitted in each wall at slab level. Inside, the walls are lined with timber workbenches, and below and above the metal louvres are single-beaded tongue-and-groove boards. The ceiling is lined with shot-edge timber boards.

=== Cottage 1 (Single Men's Quarters) ===
This building was originally located on the other side of the stables, but was moved during the Second World War to accommodate women and children evacuees. It is currently located approximately 10 metres (33 ft) from the south-east corner of the house. The external walls are clad in weatherboards and the windows are casements.

=== Meat House ===
The meat house is located in a cluster of buildings over 35 metres (115 ft) to the west of the house, and adjacent to the tennis court. It has a short-ridge hipped roof, the fourth, north-eastern side of which has been cut back. On the remaining three sides the roof forms an overhang about 2 metres (6 ft 7 in) deep that is supported by timber posts. On the south-western elevation the edge of the roof is finished with a half-metre wide, solid valance of shot-edge timber boards. The building sheltering under the roof sits on a concrete slab-on-ground. The walls are clad in weatherboards to a height off the ground of approximately 600 millimetres (24 in). A timber sill separates this from the fine steel mesh, which covers the timber frame above. There are double board doors on the north-eastern elevation. Inside the meat house is divided into two rooms by a wall made with steel mesh fixed to a timber frame. There is a single board door in this wall, which extends only to the height of the top plates of the exterior walls. While the underside of the corrugated iron roof is exposed in the first room entered, in the second there is a tongue-and-groove timber board ceiling. A step in the slab also separates the two spaces. The butcher's blocks are still in place.

=== Carpenter/Blacksmith's Workshop ===
This building has a gabled roof, and is located about 4 metres (13 ft) to the south-east of the meat house. The walls are clad in weatherboards, and there is a large opening in its southern elevation. Inside the floor is dirt and the sawn frame is exposed on each gable end and to the roof. On a wall that divides the room lengthways, timber boards are fitted vertically to the height of the top plates of the exterior walls. There are two casement windows in the northern elevation, each with 3 lights in each sash. Large double board doors open out of the building's eastern elevation. The forge appears to be made from a ship's tank, and the anvil and bellows are also still in place.

=== Garage and Chauffeur's Residence ===
This building is located about 4 metres (13 ft) west of the blacksmith's. In plan it is L-shaped, and gable roofs project along each wing. A part of the roof on the shorter wing has been extended to cover a strong room made with concrete walls and a steel door. The walls are clad in weatherboards and the windows are predominantly timber double-hung sashes with two lights in each sash. The entire building sits on a concrete slab-on-ground. Inside the garage occupies the long wing. There is a single room allocated for the driver, and its walls and ceiling are lined with tongue-and-groove timber boards. There are timber board doors. The garage was built to accommodate Arthur Youngman's Rolls-Royce, which was said to be the second bought in Queensland. There is a greasing pit for the car nearby, with a simple curved roof supported on timber posts.

=== Store/Cottage 2 ===
This building is located about 4 metres (13 ft) to the south-east of the blacksmith's. It is timber framed, sits on low stumps and has a gabled roof. The walls are clad in weatherboards. The building was originally the store and the storekeeper's residence.

=== Grain Shed ===
The grain shed is located about 15 metres (49 ft) to the south-west of the blacksmith's. It was originally used to store grain in bulk; however it is now used as a theatre. It has a low-pitched gable roof and sits on low timber stumps. The walls are clad in weatherboards and the awning windows are made of timber boards. Entry is gained via a short flight of timber stairs on the north-eastern facade. Inside the floor is lined with timber tongue-and-groove boards. The seating was provided by the Princess Cinema in Mount Gravatt, Brisbane. Adjacent to the north-west of this building is an open gable-roofed barn supported by rough timber poles.

=== Stables ===
The stables are located about 10 metres (33 ft) to the west of the grain shed and hay barn (on an adjoining allotment). It is a long narrow structure with a low-pitched gable roof. The wall and roof framing is constructed of timber stumps and poles, and vertical slabs are fitted in between those to the walls. Its north-eastern facade has a single opening, while the opposing one has a number of them. A number of stalls are separated from the western yard with rails. The three sections the building is divided into on the interior are made with top plate height slab walls.

=== Cemetery ===
The cemetery is located over 200 metres (660 ft) to the east of the homestead, and can be accessed via a secondary track. One grave, with an elaborate headstone and metal railings surrounding it, is that of two Haly children who died in 1858. They were Anastasia (1 year) and Charles (13 months), who died within weeks of each other suggesting they may have been twins. Another grave belongs to Matilda Baker (3 years). The headstone records that she died in 1864, and was the child of George and Bridgetta Baker who were employed by the Halys. Another early grave belongs to a stockman, Henry Weldon, who died at age 19 years in 1869. The headstone's inscription reads "Boast not thyself of tomorrow for thou knowest not what a day may bring forth". As they are weathering, small metal, inscribed plaques have been affixed to these headstones by members of the Leu family. Arthur Youngman, who died in 1935, and his wife Daphne who died in 1975, are both buried here. The cemetery is currently in use, as later family members have been interred there. The current owners tell a story, which suggests that 8 graves marked by local boulders belong to Aboriginal children.

=== Gardens ===
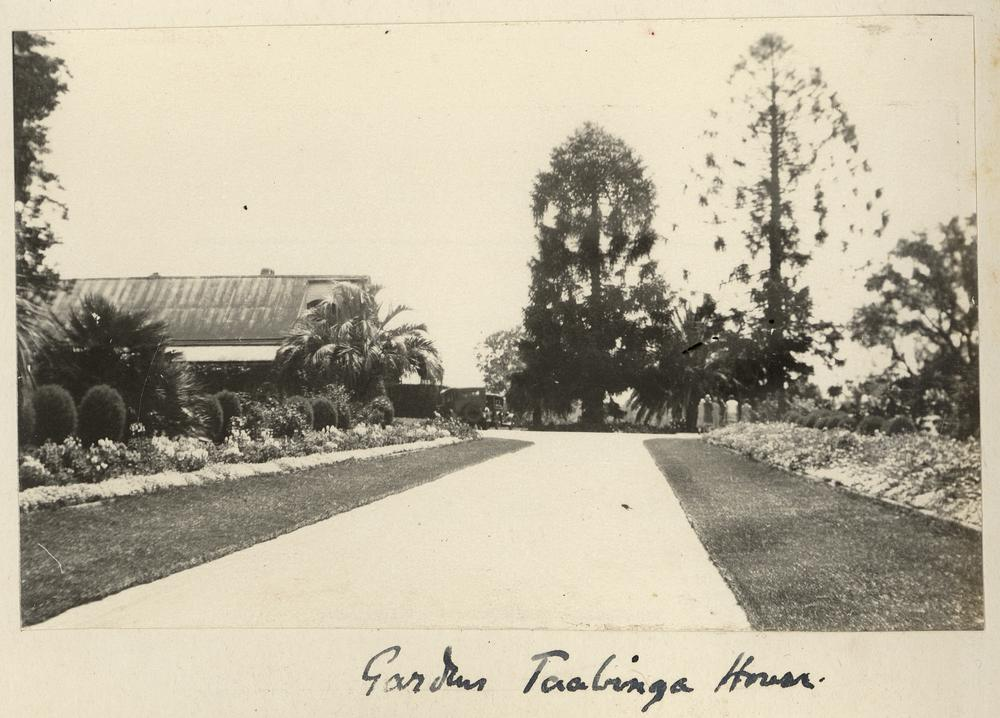
Gardens, 1927

There appear to be remnants of the gardens established by Arthur Youngman. On either side of the entry to the homestead complex, to the north-east of the house, stand two large palms. The area to the east of the house is covered in lawn. A bunya pine stands to the north of the house. Adjacent to the south-western corner of the house stands another tall pine.

== Heritage listing ==
Taabinga Homestead was listed on the Queensland Heritage Register on 21 October 1992 having satisfied the following criteria.

The place is important in demonstrating the evolution or pattern of Queensland's history.

Taabinga station was established in the 1840s by the Haly brothers in the wake of Henry Stuart Russell's exploration of the Burnett district in 1842. The development of Taabinga is an important part of the pastoral history of Queensland, and the site stands as testimony to the emergence of Taabinga as one of the earliest principal pastoral holdings in the Burnett district. The physical expansion of the site, especially during the 1890s and early 1900s, reflects the growth of the Queensland rural economy during this period.

The place is important in demonstrating the principal characteristics of a particular class of cultural places.

The principal built elements of Taabinga include the main residence built between the 1840s and 1850s, as well as the kitchen; dairy; single men's quarters; meat house; carpenter/blacksmith's workshop; garage and chauffeur's residence; storehouse; grain shed; and cemetery. Most of these structures were built during the 1890s and early 1900s. The stables, reputedly erected around the same time as the main residence, are now located on an adjoining lot. The survival of these structures in a well-preserved state provides an example of an early homestead setting, and the relationship between these elements contribute to an understanding of early station life and as such it is important in demonstrating the principal characteristics of a particular class of cultural places.

The place is important because of its aesthetic significance.

The Homestead site provides a well-preserved example of vernacular architecture of the Queensland pastoral frontier and is set within mature landscaped gardens. The main residence exhibits workmanship and design, and its use of local resources for building highlights the adaptive lifestyle of Queensland's pastoral pioneers.

The place has a special association with the life or work of a particular person, group or organisation of importance in Queensland's history.

Taabinga has a special association with brothers Charles Robert and William O'Grady Haly, who were early pioneers of the Logan and Burnett regions. The site also has a special association with the Youngman family. Arthur Youngman was responsible for the development of the homestead complex during the 1890s and early 1900s and the property remains in the Youngman family.
