= Inverlaw =

- Suburb
- Interactive map of Inverlaw
- Coordinates: 26.5830°S 151.7655°E
- Country: Australia
- State: Queensland
- LGA: South Burnett Region
- Location: 16.0 km (9.9 mi) SW of Kingaroy; 153 km (95 mi) SW of Gympie; 218 km (135 mi) NW of Brisbane

Government
  - State electorate: Nanango
  - Federal division: Maranoa

Area
  - Total: 67.6 km^{2} (26.1 sq mi)

Population
  - Total: 190 (2021 census)
  - Density: 2.81/km^{2} (7.28/sq mi)
- Time zone: UTC+10:00 (AEST)
- Postcode: 4610
Suburbs around Inverlaw
Gordonbrook	Gordonbrook	Kingaroy
Wattle Grove	Inverlaw	Taabinga
Benair	Haly Creek	Goodger

Inverlaw is a rural locality in the South Burnett Region, Queensland, Australia. In the 2021 census, Inverlaw had a population of 190 people.

== History ==
Four Mile Gully Provisional School opened on 12 November 1907; it was built by Messrs Knudsen and Kirchheim at a cost of £99. On 1 January 1909, it became Four Mile Gully State School. On 17 September 1912, it was renamed Inverlaw State School. It closed on 24 May 1968. It was at 168 Wooden Hut Road (corner of Inverlaw School Road, 26.59064°S 151.74916°E).

In 1910, an organisation of local farmers called the Four Mile Gully Association was formed. In 1918, it decided that the public hall was needed. In 1920, pioneer R.J. Crawford donated two acres of land for the hall. The Inverlaw Farmers Hall was opened in 1921. Its centenary was celebrated on Saturday 19 June 2021.

A stump-capping ceremony was held for the Inverlaw Methodist Church on Thursday 29 March 1917. The church was completed later that year. It could seat 120 people and was built at a cost of £230. It closed in 1997 and was sold for $12,000 in 2002. It was on the south-east corner of Kingaroy Burrandowan Road and Deep Creek Road (26.59704°S 151.73448°E). As at July 2024, the church building is still extant.

== Demographics ==
In the 2016 census, Inverlaw had a population of 203 people.

In the 2021 census, Inverlaw had a population of 190 people.

== Education ==
There are no schools in Inverlaw. The nearest government primary schools are Taabinga State School and Kingaroy State School, both in neighbouring Kingaroy to the east and north-east respectively. The nearest government secondary school is Kingaroy State High School in Kingaroy.

== Amenities ==
Inverlaw Farmers Hall is on Kingaroy Burrandowan Road (26.59445°S 151.718230°E). There is a monument erected on the 70th anniversary of the hall which commemorates the pioneers of the district.
