= Mannuem =

- Suburb
- Interactive map of Mannuem
- Coordinates: 26.6283°S 151.5969°E
- Country: Australia
- State: Queensland
- LGA: South Burnett Region
- Location: 29.3 km (18.2 mi) WSW of Kingaroy; 171 km (106 mi) SW of Gympie; 232 km (144 mi) NW of Brisbane

Government
  - State electorate: Nanango
  - Federal division: Maranoa

Area
  - Total: 129.7 km^{2} (50.1 sq mi)

Population
  - Total: 87 (2021 census)
  - Density: 0.671/km^{2} (1.737/sq mi)
- Time zone: UTC+10:00 (AEST)
- Postcode: 4610
Suburbs around Mannuem
| Chahpingah | Dangore | Wattle Grove |
| Ironpot | Mannuem | Benair |
| Boyneside | Kumbia | Kumbia |

Mannuem is a rural locality in the South Burnett Region, Queensland, Australia. In the 2021 census, Mannuem had a population of 87 people.

== Geography ==
The land use is grazing on native vegetation in the west of the locality with crop growing in the east.

There are a number of homesteads in the locality, including:

- Blaxland (26.6083°S 151.6228°E)
- Blaxland (26.6329°S 151.6118°E)
- Brolga Downs (26.6908°S 151.6072°E)
- Glanvillan (26.6069°S 151.6061°E)
- Glanvillan (26.6098°S 151.6044°E)
- Highfield (26.6807°S 151.6161°E)
- Manneum Park (26.6600°S 151.6068°E)
- Mannuem Brae (26.6415°S 151.6041°E)
- Mannuem Glen (26.6834°S 151.6097°E)
- Pagans Paddock (26.6562°S 151.6053°E)
- Redbank (26.6351°S 151.5982°E)
- Rose Hill (26.6180°S 151.6051°E)
- The Cedors (26.6973°S 151.6021°E)

== History ==
Reedy Creek Provisional School opened on 5 June 1911. Mannuem Creek Provisional School opened on 12 June 1911. The two schools operated as half-time schools (meaning they shared a single teacher). Reedy Creek Provisional School closed on 30 September 1912, enabling Mannuem Creek Provisional School to be a full-time school. On 1 August 1913, it became Mannuem Creek State School. On 27 July 1916, Reedy Creek State School was opened. Reedy Creek State School closed on 31 December 1963, while Mannuem Creek State School closed in 1983. Mannuem Creek State School was on the north-east corner of Mannuem Road and Johnstons Road (approx 26.6230°S 151.6066°E). The Mannuem Creek State School buildings were purchased by Kingaroy Lutheran Church and relocated to establish St John's Lutheran School in Kingaroy. Reedy Creek State School was at 993 Reedy Creek Road in neighbouring Benair to the west.

== Demographics ==
In the 2016 census, Mannuem had a population of 90 people.

In the 2021 census, Mannuem had a population of 87 people.

== Education ==
There are no schools in Mannuem. The nearest government primary school is Kumbia State School in neighbouring Kumbia to the south-west. The nearest government secondary school is Kingaroy State High School in Kingaroy to the north-east.
