= Taabinga, Queensland =

Taabinga
- Town
- Interactive map of Taabinga
- Coordinates: 26.5838°S 151.8336°E
- Country: Australia
- State: Queensland
- LGA: South Burnett Region
- Location: 6.2 km (3.9 mi) SSW of Kingaroy; 148 km (92 mi) N of Toowoomba; 219 km (136 mi) NW of Brisbane

Government
  - State electorate: Nanango
  - Federal division: Maranoa

Area
  - Total: 31.2 km^{2} (12.0 sq mi)

Population
  - Total: 601 (2021 census)
  - Density: 19.26/km^{2} (49.89/sq mi)
- Time zone: UTC+10:00 (AEST)
- Postcode: 4610
Localities around Taabinga
Inverlaw	Kingaroy	Kingaroy
Inverlaw	Taabinga	Coolabunia
Goodger	Goodger	Goodger

Taabinga is a rural town and locality in the South Burnett Region, Queensland, Australia. In the 2021 census, the locality of Taabinga had a population of 601 people.

== History ==
The town takes its name from the Taabinga pastoral run occupied by pastoralist Charles Robert Haly circa 1849, using Waka language word, Bujiebara dialect, dha-bengga indicating place of jumper ants.

Taabinga Village Provisional School opened on 10 August 1897. On 1 January 1909, it became Taabinga Village State School. It closed on 16 July 1961 and the students transferred to the new Taabinga State School.

St Paul's Anglican church was dedicated in 1904. It closed in 1910. The church building was moved to Taabinga Village.

Erin Vale State School opened in 1911, but was renamed Stuart Valley State School in 1912. It closed in 1961. It was at approx 15 Toomeys Road (26.61094°S 151.78445°E) to the east of the Stuart River.

Taabinga Road State School opened circa August 1924. On 1 November 1924, it was renamed Boonyouin State School. It closed in 1953. It was on the western side of Flagstone Creek Road in Haly Creek to the south-west (approx 26.7033°S 151.7107°E).

Taabinga State School opened in July 1961 with the students pupils transferred from the closing Taabinga Village State School. It is now within the locality boundaries of Kingaroy.

== Demographics ==
In the 2016 census, the locality of Taabinga had a population of 549 people.

In the 2021 census, the locality of Taabinga had a population of 601 people.

== Education ==
There are no schools in the locality of Taabinga. The nearest government primary schools are Taabinga State School now located within neighbouring Kingaroy to the north and Coolabunia State School in neighbouring Coolabunia to the west. The nearest government secondary school is Kingaroy State High School, also in Kingaroy. There are also non-government schools in Kingaroy.

== Facilities ==
Taabinga Cemetery is at 30 Pioneer Avenue (26.5796°S 151.8267°E). There is a crematorium nearby at 24 Pioneer Avenue.
