= Kumbia, Queensland =

Kumbia
- Town
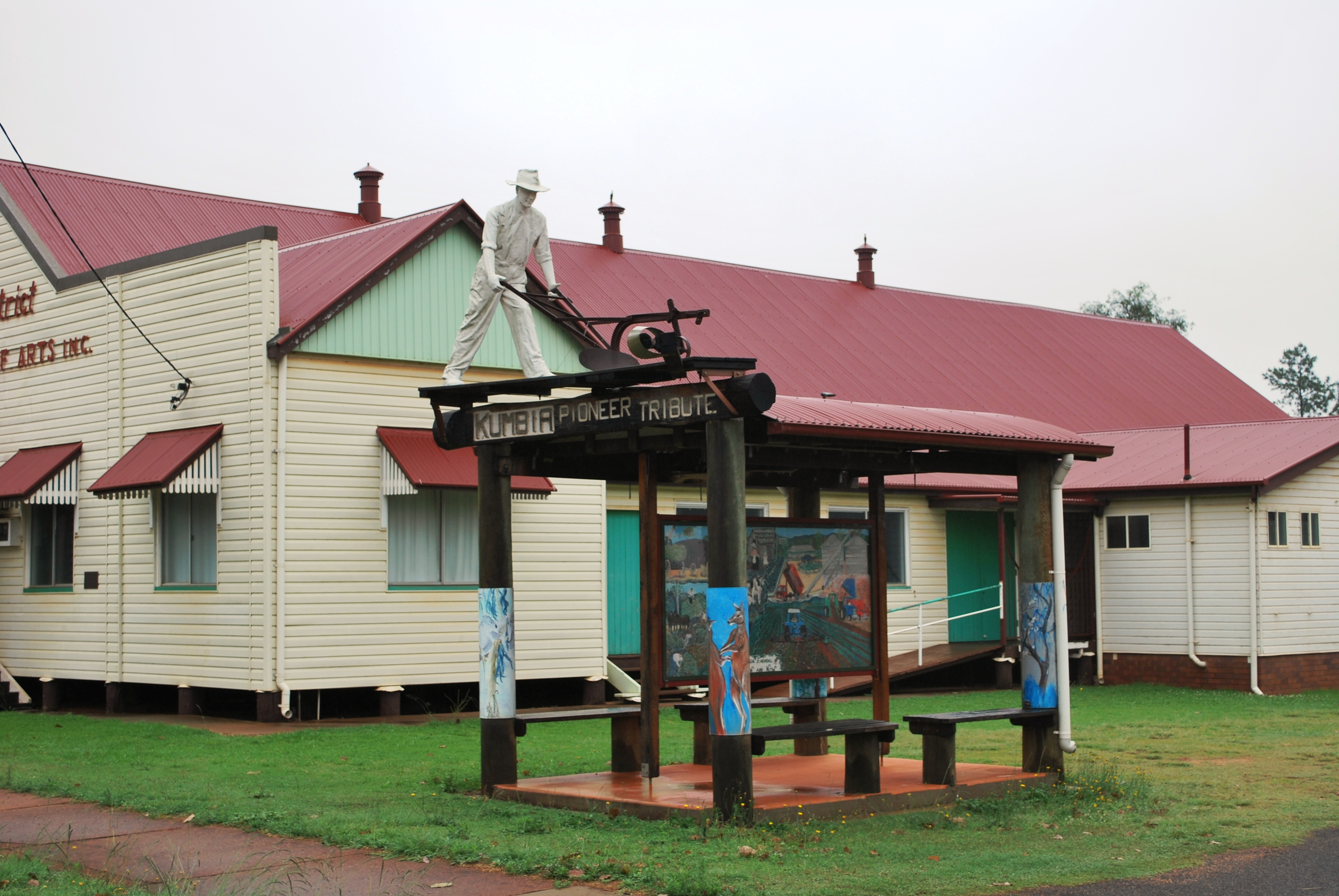
- Kumbia Pioneer tribute beside the Memorial School of Arts hall

- Interactive map of Kumbia
- Coordinates: 26.6902°S 151.655°E
- Country: Australia
- State: Queensland
- LGA: South Burnett Region
- Location: 22.3 km (13.9 mi) SW of Kingaroy; 149 km (93 mi) N of Toowoomba; 222 km (138 mi) NW of Brisbane

Government
  - State electorate: Nanango
  - Federal division: Maranoa

Area
  - Total: 69.6 km^{2} (26.9 sq mi)

Population
  - Total: 301 (2021 census)
  - Density: 4.325/km^{2} (11.201/sq mi)
- Time zone: UTC+10:00 (AEST)
- Postcode: 4610
Localities around Kumbia
Mannuem	Benair	Haly Creek
Mannuem	Kumbia	Haly Creek
Boyneside	Alice Creek	Alice Creek

Kumbia (pronounced "come-bia") is a rural town and locality in the South Burnett Region, Queensland, Australia. In the 2021 census, the locality of Kumbia had a population of 301 people.

== Geography ==
The town is located on the Bunya Highway. It is the main street for the town, but is known with the town as Bell Street.

== History ==
The name Kumbia is from the Waka language but its meaning is uncertain, possibly referring to white ant nests or a small scrub vine.

On 30 July 1912, the Queensland Government aucitoned 44 land parcels in the new town of Kumbia, each about 1 rood (11,000 sq ft; 1,000 m^{2}).

A postal receiving office opened in 1913, being replaced by Kumbia Post Office on 19 July 1915.

The Kumbia State School opened on 2 February 1914 and celebrated its 100-year anniversary in 2014.

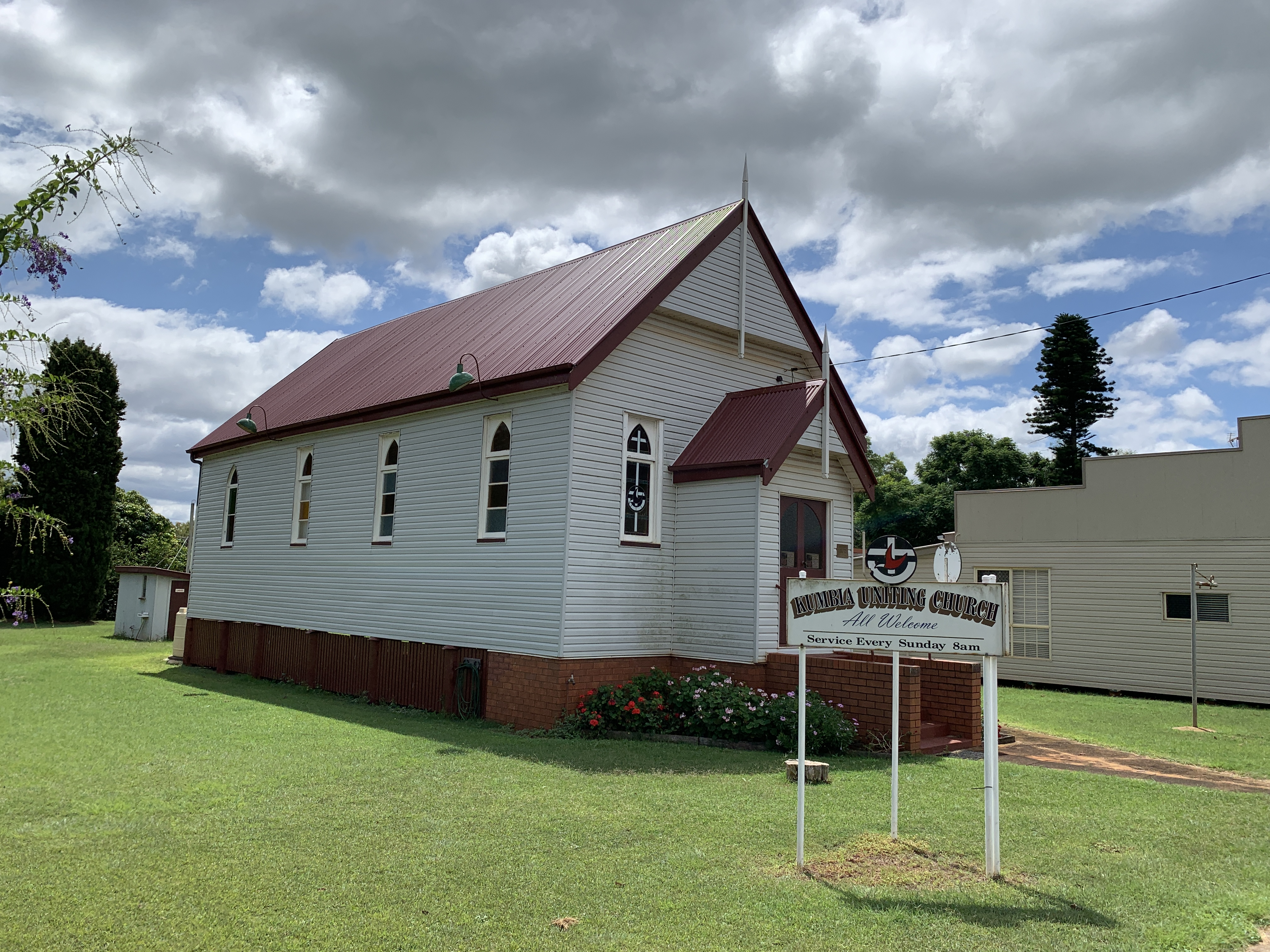
Kumbia Uniting Church, formerly Methodist, 2023

Kumbia Methodist Church opened in 1914. It was built from timber at a cost of £165 and could seat 150 people. As part of the amalgamation that created the Uniting Church in Australia, in 1977 it became Kumbia Uniting Church.

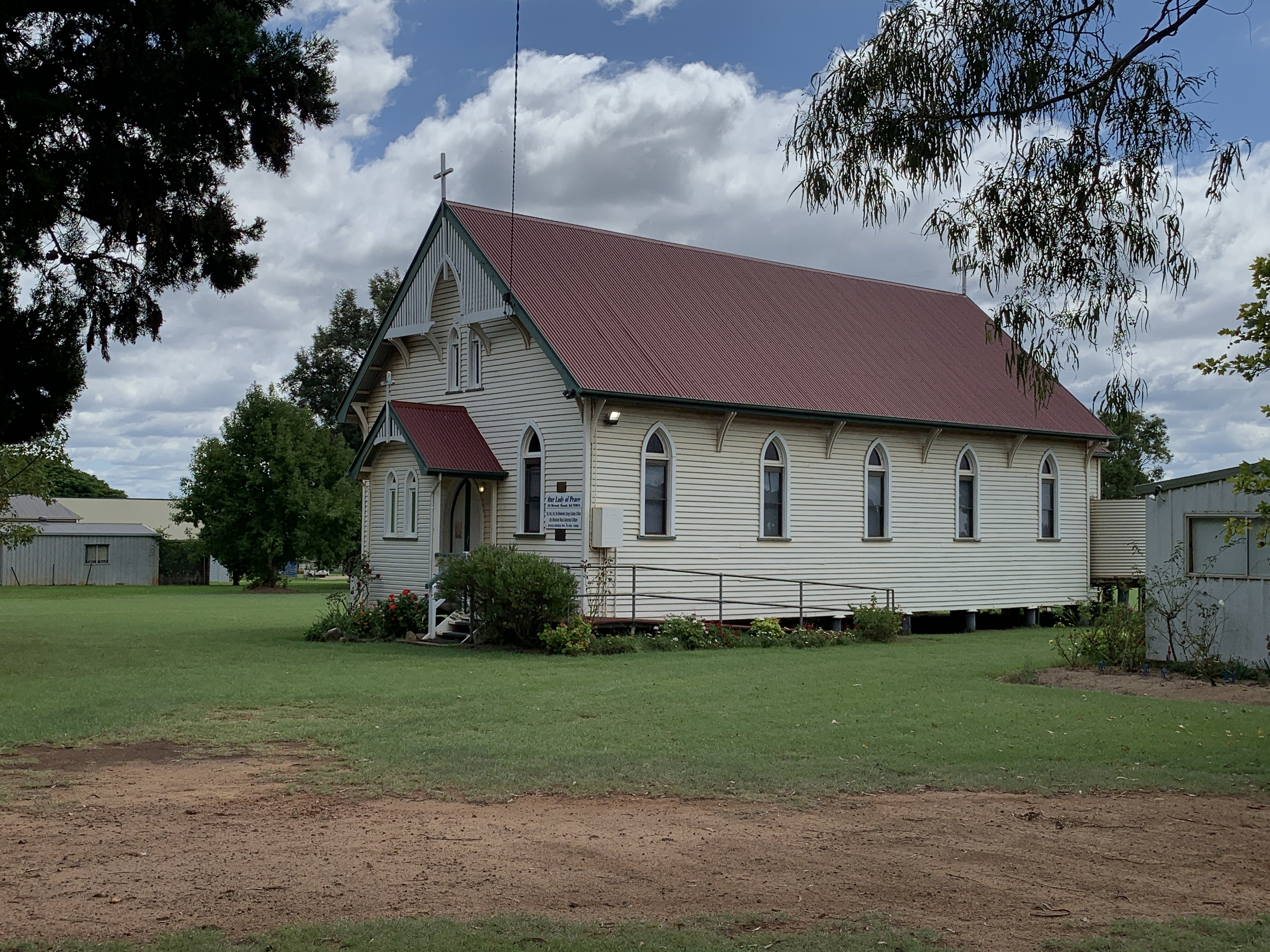
Our Lady of Peace Catholic Church, 2023

On Sunday 18 May 1919, the Roman Catholic Church in Kumbia was officially opened and consecrated as The Lady of the Sacred Heart Catholic Church by Archbishop James Duhig. It was built from timber. Later it becomes known as Our Lady of Peace Catholic Church.

As a memorial for those from the Kumbia district who had died in World War I, a school of arts hall was opened in Kumbia on Saturday 2 September 1922 with a sports day followed by a concert and dance in the evening. The building cost £1,250. More than 1,000 people attended the sports day with an estimated 570 people attending the evening entertainment. The day had been declared as a local public holiday.

Trinity Evangelical Lutheran Church was built in 1914. It was replaced by a new church building in 1959. It was later renamed Peace Lutheran Church.

In May 1918, St Paul's Anglican Church was officially opened and dedicated by Archdeacon Rivers. A new St Paul's Church of England was dedicated on 28 November 1970 by the Right Reverend Wilfrid John Hudson. Its closure circa 2015 was approved by Bishop Cameron Venables.

== Demographics ==
In the 2011 census, the locality of Kumbia had a population of 352 people.

In the 2016 census, the locality of Kumbia had a population of 294 people.

In the 2021 census, the locality of Kumbia had a population of 301 people.

== Education ==
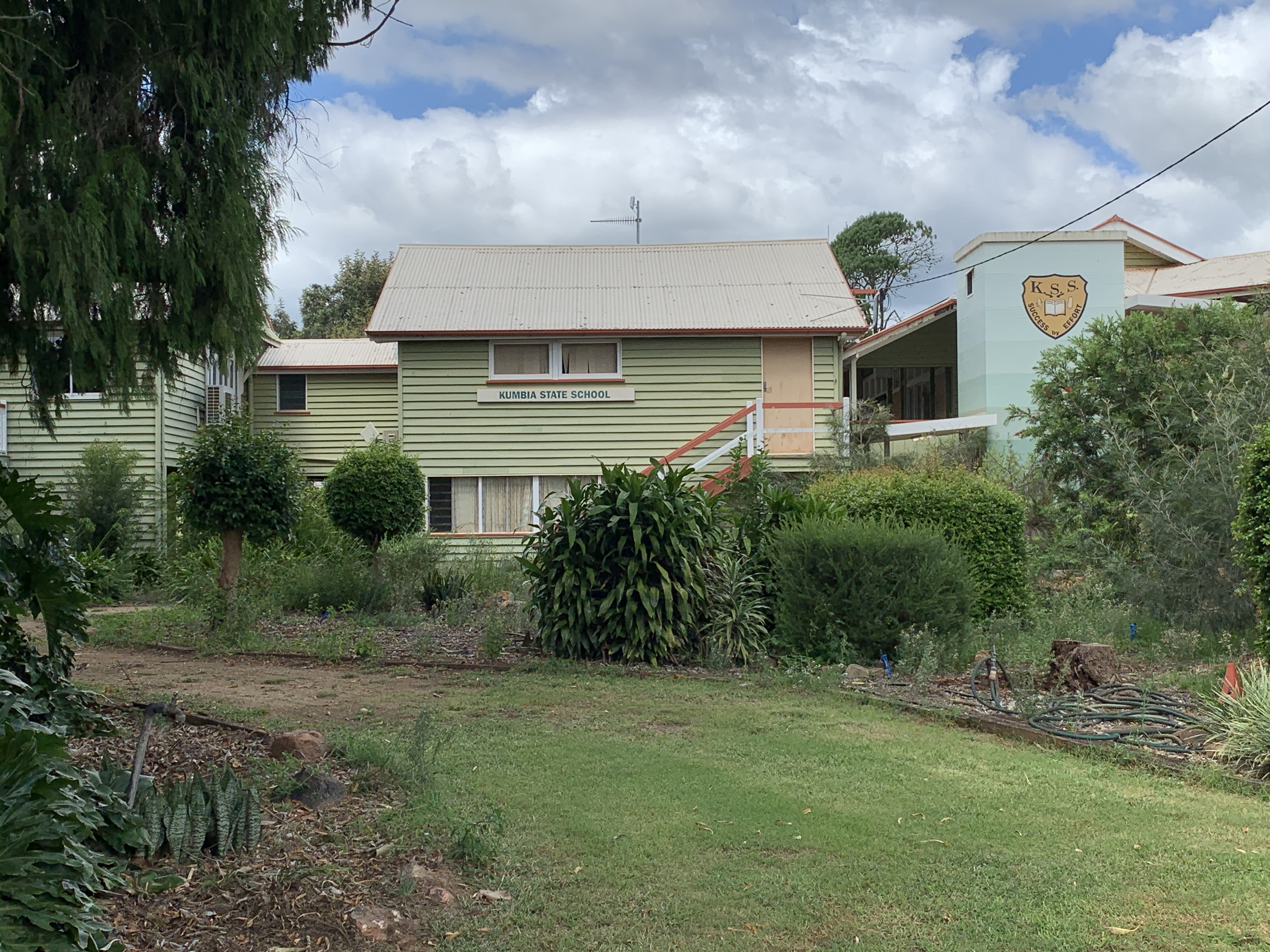
Kumbia State School, 2023

Kumbia State School is a government primary (Prep–6) school for boys and girls at 2–24 Bell Street (26.6932°S 151.6515°E). In 2018, the school had an enrolment of 62 students with 7 teachers (5 full-time equivalent) and 9 non-teaching staff (4 full-time equivalent).

There are no secondary schools in Kumbia. The nearest government secondary school is Kingaroy State High School in Kingaroy to the north-east.

== Amenities ==
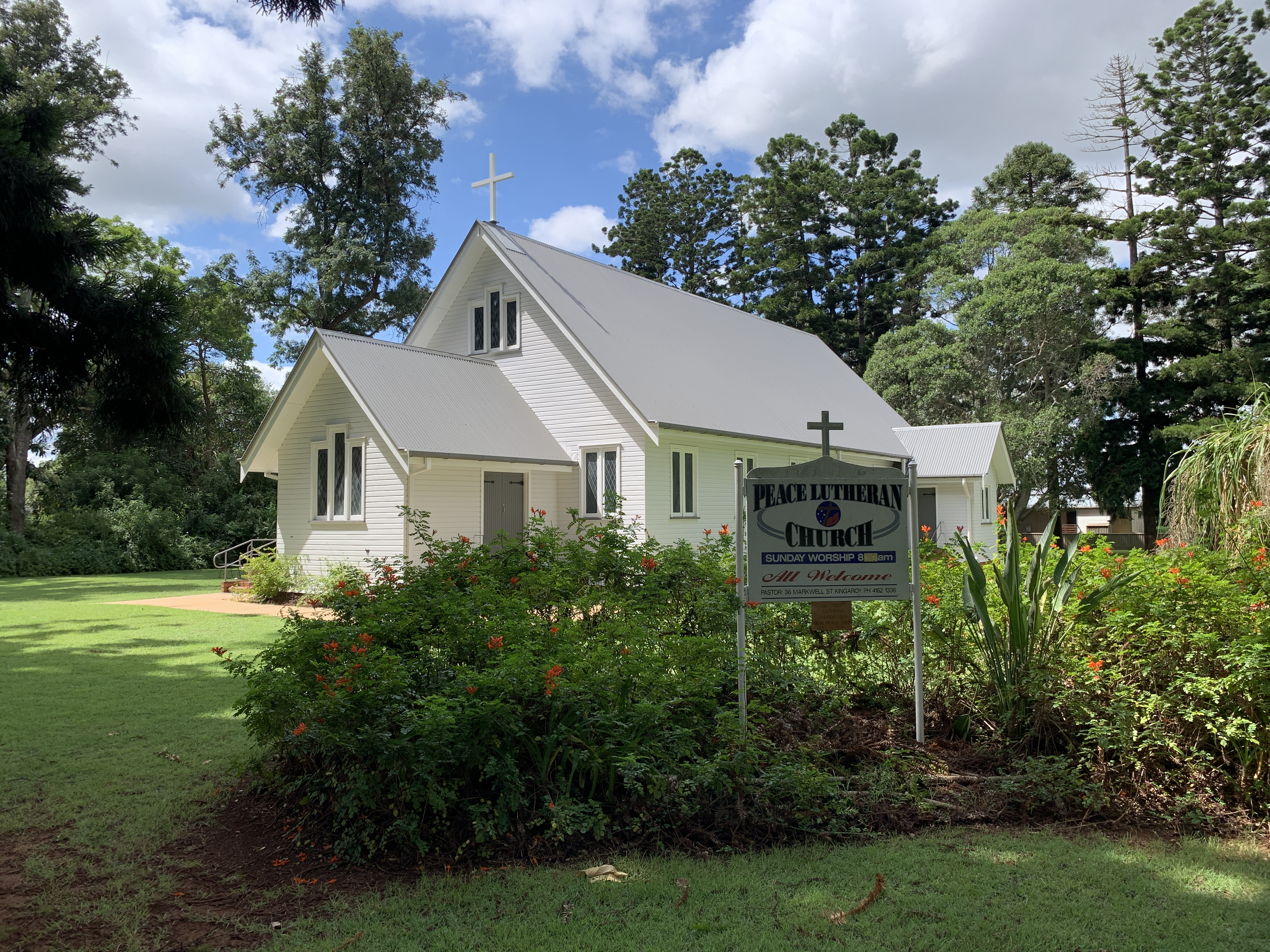
Peace Lutheran Church, 2023

Kumbia has many small street-front shops including a Fuel Station with post office, store and caravan park, a mechanic, a general store, a butcher's shop and a pub.

Kumbia Memorial School of Arts is at 29–31 Bell Street (26.6919°S 151.6526°E).

The Kumbia branch of the Queensland Country Women's Association meets at the QCWA Hall at 38 Bell Street (26.6917°S 151.6536°E).

Our Lady of Peace Catholic Church is at 44 Brook Road (26.688685°S 151.6528°E). It is part of the Kingaroy Nanango Catholic Parish within the Roman Catholic Archdiocese of Brisbane.

Kumbia Uniting Church is at 33 Bell Street (26.691617°S 151.6531°E).

Peace Lutheran Church is at 10 Koehler Street (26.689039°S 151.658°E).

== Facilities ==
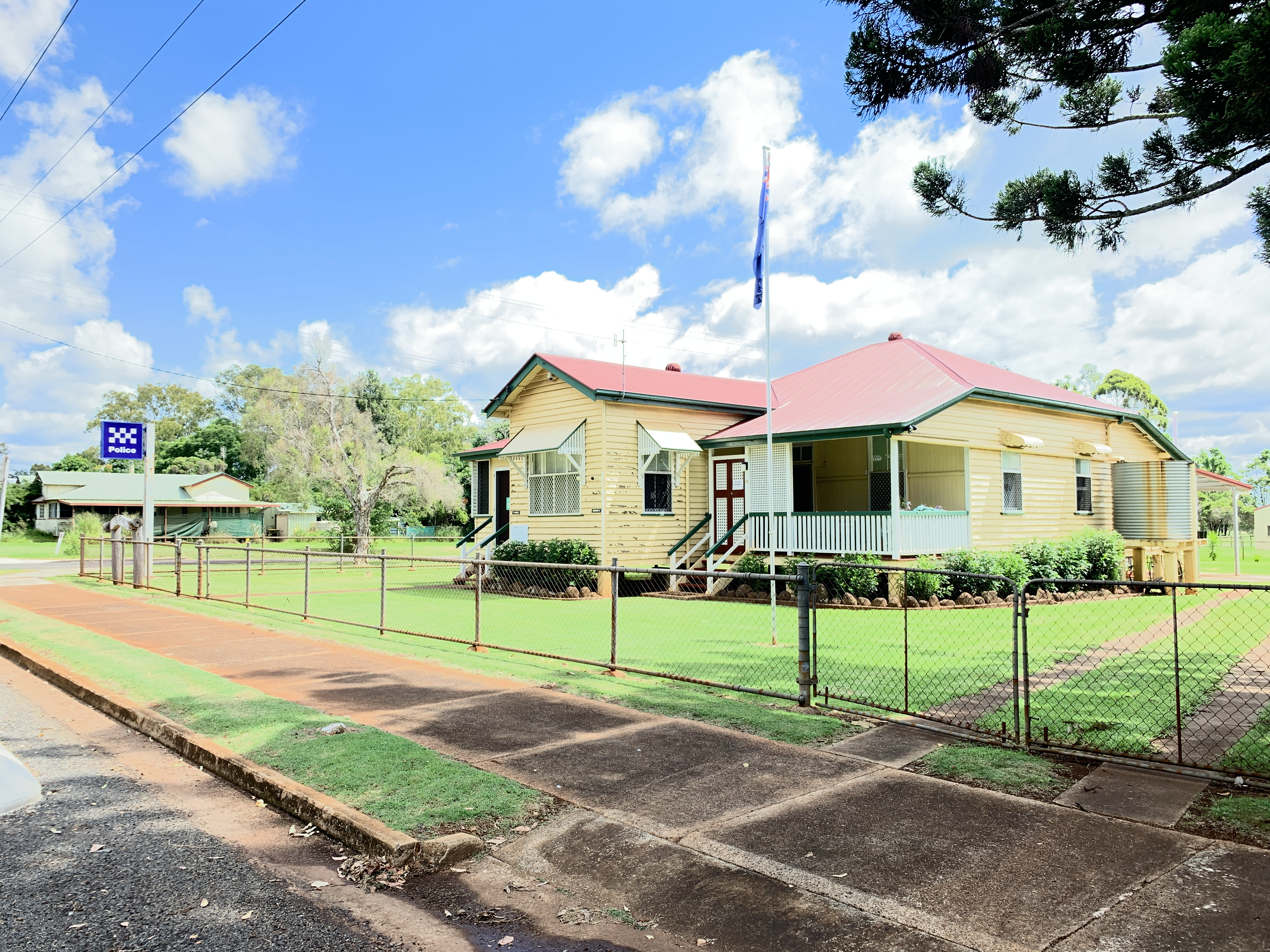
Kumbia Police Station, 2023

There are three emergency services based in Kumbia:

- Kumbia Police Station at 25 Bell Street (26.6921°S 151.6523°E)
- Kumbia SES Facility at 17–19 Short Street (26.6916°S 151.6549°E)
- Kumbia Fire Station at 16 Gordon Street (26.6916°S 151.6518°E)

There are two cemeteries in Kumbia:

- Taabinga-Kumbia Lutheran Cemetery on Kumbia Back Road (26.6735°S 151.6902°E)
- Kumbia General Cemetery on Kumbia Cemetery Road (26.7016°S 151.6465°E)

== Notable residents ==
- Warren Truss, Deputy Prime Minister of Australia, lived in Kumbia
