= Kingaroy =

- Town
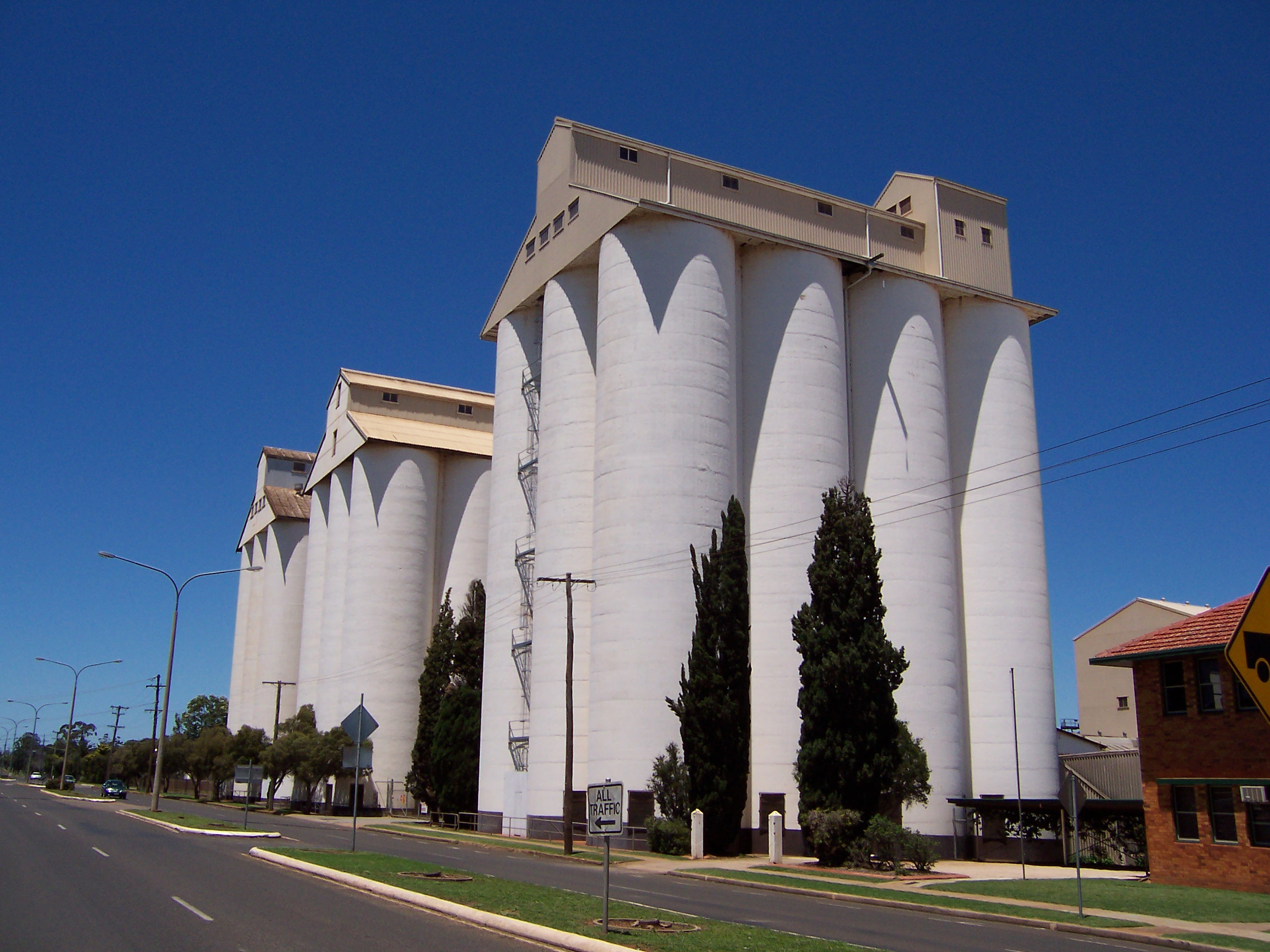
- The peanut silos in Haly Street are the town's tallest structures and most visible landmark

- Interactive map of Kingaroy
- Coordinates: 26.541°S 151.840°E
- Country: Australia
- State: Queensland
- LGA: South Burnett Region
- Location: 142 km (88 mi) WSW of Gympie; 153 km (95 mi) N of Toowoomba; 222 km (138 mi) NW of Brisbane; 111 km (69 mi) NE of Dalby

Government
  - State electorate: Nanango
  - Federal division: Maranoa

Area
  - Total: 68.5 km^{2} (26.4 sq mi)
- Elevation: 441.9 m (1,450 ft)

Population
  - Total: 10,266 (2021 census)
  - Density: 149.87/km^{2} (388.16/sq mi)
- Time zone: UTC+10:00 (AEST)
- Postcode: 4610
- Mean max temp: 24.8 °C (76.6 °F)
- Mean min temp: 11.5 °C (52.7 °F)
- Annual rainfall: 779.1 mm (30.67 in)
Localities around Kingaroy
Crawford	Memerambi	Corndale
Gordonbrook	Kingaroy	Booie
Inverlaw	Taabinga	Coolbunia

Kingaroy (/kɪŋəˈrɔɪ/) is a rural town and locality in the South Burnett Region, Queensland, Australia. The town is situated on the junction of the D'Aguilar and the Bunya Highways, 218 kilometres (135 mi) north-west of the state capital Brisbane and 141 kilometres (88 mi) south west of Gympie. In the 2021 census, the locality of Kingaroy had a population of 10,266 people.

Kingaroy is the seat of the South Burnett Region. It is known as the "Peanut Capital of Australia" because Australia's largest peanut processing plant is located in the town and its peanut silo dominates the skyline. Kingaroy is also known as the hometown of former Premier of Queensland, Sir Joh Bjelke-Petersen.

== Geography ==
Kingaroy is surrounded by extensive (and very picturesque) farmlands interspersed with low rolling hills. The Booie Range lies immediately north-east of the town and the Bunya Mountains about 55 kilometres (34 mi) to the south-west.

The Stuart River (26.565304°S 151.808283°E) flows northwards on the western outskirts of the town. The locality is part of the Burnett River catchment. The productive lands of the catchment feature sedimentary floodplains. The rich fertile soils of the floodplains are the agricultural and resource backbone of the region. While there are benefits of the flooding there are also risks including the loss of vegetation in riparian zones, biosecurity issues and spread of weed species.

The locality sits in the Tarong Coal Basin.

Kingaroy varies in altitude / elevation / height above sea level from about 415 metres (1,362 ft) (highlight point) to 562 metres (1,844 ft) (highlight point) above sea level.

Edenvale is a neighbourhood within the locality (26.5662°S 151.8573°E), which takes its name from the Edenvale railway station which was named on 15 March 1911 by the Queensland Railways Department, because the land for the railway station was resumed from "Paradise Farm".

=== Climate ===
Kingaroy experiences an elevation-influenced humid subtropical climate (Köppen: Cfa), with very warm, relatively wet summers and mild, dry winters with cold nights. Annual precipitation averages 654.7 millimetres (25.78 in), with a summer maximum. Record temperatures have ranged from 41.6 °C (106.9 °F) on 12 February 2017 to −6.7 °C (19.9 °F) on 18 July 1961.

Climate data for Kingaroy Airport (26º34'12"S, 151º50'24"E, 434 m AMSL) (2001–2024 normals and extremes)
Month	Jan	Feb	Mar	Apr	May	Jun	Jul	Aug	Sep	Oct	Nov	Dec	Year
Record high °C (°F)	41.0 (105.8)	41.6 (106.9)	38.2 (100.8)	35.0 (95.0)	31.8 (89.2)	27.7 (81.9)	27.2 (81.0)	33.3 (91.9)	36.7 (98.1)	39.0 (102.2)	38.9 (102.0)	40.5 (104.9)	41.6 (106.9)
Mean daily maximum °C (°F)	30.9 (87.6)	29.8 (85.6)	28.3 (82.9)	25.8 (78.4)	22.4 (72.3)	19.9 (67.8)	19.6 (67.3)	21.9 (71.4)	25.0 (77.0)	27.4 (81.3)	29.1 (84.4)	30.2 (86.4)	25.9 (78.5)
Mean daily minimum °C (°F)	18.0 (64.4)	17.7 (63.9)	16.4 (61.5)	12.1 (53.8)	7.6 (45.7)	5.5 (41.9)	3.9 (39.0)	4.4 (39.9)	8.2 (46.8)	11.8 (53.2)	14.6 (58.3)	16.8 (62.2)	11.4 (52.6)
Record low °C (°F)	11.0 (51.8)	11.1 (52.0)	4.4 (39.9)	−0.6 (30.9)	−3.0 (26.6)	−5.0 (23.0)	−6.0 (21.2)	−4.9 (23.2)	−2.1 (28.2)	0.3 (32.5)	2.4 (36.3)	6.5 (43.7)	−6.0 (21.2)
Average precipitation mm (inches)	90.2 (3.55)	89.7 (3.53)	73.1 (2.88)	25.2 (0.99)	37.6 (1.48)	37.6 (1.48)	29.2 (1.15)	26.9 (1.06)	28.7 (1.13)	60.1 (2.37)	67.1 (2.64)	103.2 (4.06)	667.2 (26.27)
Average precipitation days (≥ 1.0 mm)	6.1	6.5	6.5	3.8	4.2	3.7	3.4	3.0	3.2	5.9	5.3	7.4	59
Average afternoon relative humidity (%)	47	52	48	45	43	49	44	36	35	33	41	43	43
Average dew point °C (°F)	15.6 (60.1)	16.4 (61.5)	14.2 (57.6)	11.3 (52.3)	6.9 (44.4)	6.5 (43.7)	4.8 (40.6)	3.4 (38.1)	5.7 (42.3)	7.5 (45.5)	11.3 (52.3)	13.8 (56.8)	9.8 (49.6)
Source: Bureau of Meteorology (2001–2024 normals and extremes)

The original weather station at Kingaroy's Prince Street had been recording rainfall since 1905 and temperatures since 1947. However, it closed in 2000, in favour of the new, more advanced weather station at the town's airport 2.2 kilometres (1.4 mi) SW.

Climate data for Kingaroy Prince Street (26º33'00"S, 151º51'00"E, 442 m AMSL) (1947–2001 normals, extremes 1957–2001, rainfall to 1905)
Month	Jan	Feb	Mar	Apr	May	Jun	Jul	Aug	Sep	Oct	Nov	Dec	Year
Record high °C (°F)	41.0 (105.8)	39.0 (102.2)	36.0 (96.8)	33.6 (92.5)	29.7 (85.5)	28.4 (83.1)	27.4 (81.3)	30.3 (86.5)	34.0 (93.2)	37.9 (100.2)	38.3 (100.9)	40.8 (105.4)	41.0 (105.8)
Mean daily maximum °C (°F)	29.5 (85.1)	28.8 (83.8)	27.6 (81.7)	25.1 (77.2)	21.6 (70.9)	18.9 (66.0)	18.5 (65.3)	20.1 (68.2)	23.3 (73.9)	26.0 (78.8)	28.1 (82.6)	29.6 (85.3)	24.8 (76.6)
Mean daily minimum °C (°F)	17.4 (63.3)	17.5 (63.5)	15.8 (60.4)	12.1 (53.8)	8.6 (47.5)	5.4 (41.7)	4.0 (39.2)	4.8 (40.6)	7.9 (46.2)	11.7 (53.1)	14.4 (57.9)	16.5 (61.7)	11.3 (52.4)
Record low °C (°F)	8.8 (47.8)	6.7 (44.1)	6.1 (43.0)	−0.6 (30.9)	−3.9 (25.0)	−5.3 (22.5)	−6.7 (19.9)	−6.0 (21.2)	−2.2 (28.0)	−1.1 (30.0)	3.5 (38.3)	6.5 (43.7)	−6.7 (19.9)
Average precipitation mm (inches)	114.1 (4.49)	95.5 (3.76)	77.5 (3.05)	46.8 (1.84)	40.2 (1.58)	42.6 (1.68)	39.4 (1.55)	28.6 (1.13)	37.9 (1.49)	65.3 (2.57)	77.2 (3.04)	110.7 (4.36)	776.2 (30.56)
Average precipitation days (≥ 1.0 mm)	8.4	7.7	6.9	4.5	4.3	4.2	4.1	3.4	4.0	5.8	6.6	8.0	67.9
Average afternoon relative humidity (%)	53	56	54	51	52	51	48	44	42	46	47	49	49
Average dew point °C (°F)	17.6 (63.7)	17.7 (63.9)	15.8 (60.4)	12.7 (54.9)	10.2 (50.4)	7.3 (45.1)	5.9 (42.6)	6.0 (42.8)	7.9 (46.2)	11.4 (52.5)	14.1 (57.4)	16.1 (61.0)	11.9 (53.4)
Source: Bureau of Meteorology (1947-2001 normals, extremes 1957-2001, rainfall to 1905)

== Etymology ==
The origin of the name Kingaroy is usually claimed to be derived from the Wakka Wakka Aboriginal word for 'Red Ant'. The local Kingaroy Rugby League football team is known as "the Red Ants" and a Red Ant features on the old Kingaroy Shire coat of arms. A Wakka Wakka Word List provides the following explanation: "Derived from 'king', a small black ant, and 'dhu'roi', meaning hungry. The name was suggested by a local Aboriginal helper of the surveyor, Hector Munro, who surveyed the original grazing holding of this name, on account of these ants being a pest at the survey camp.". Munro selected Wakka Wakka words describing various species of ants when he surveyed a number of local towns, including Taabinga (dha' be'ngga) and Mondure (mon'dhur).

== History ==
Wakka Wakka (Waka Waka, Wocca Wocca, Wakawaka) is an Australian Aboriginal language spoken in the Burnett River catchment. The Wakka Wakka language region includes the landscape within the local government boundaries of the North and South Burnett Regional Council, particularly the towns of Cherbourg, Murgon, Kingaroy, Gayndah, Eidsvold and Mundubbera.

Rural settlement of the area dates back to 1843 when one of the first selections was made at Burrandowan (west of Kingaroy) by squatter and explorer Henry Stuart Russell. Even through Russell was reputedly the first European to realise the potential of the South Burnett, it was Simon Scott of Taromeo (now Blackbutt) and the Haly brothers of Taabinga who brought the first flocks of sheep to the area in the late 1850s.

In 1878, the district where Kingaroy now stands was settled by the Markwell brothers. When the first resumptions were made from the enormous Taabinga holding, the brothers selected two adjoining areas and in 1883 these leases were converted to freehold and became known as the 'Kingaroy Paddock'. The corner of this paddock was located on what is now known as Haly Street, named after the brothers who settled at Taabinga Station about 12 kilometres (7 mi) south-west of present-day Kingaroy. A small, prosperous village grew up around Taabinga in the 1890s.

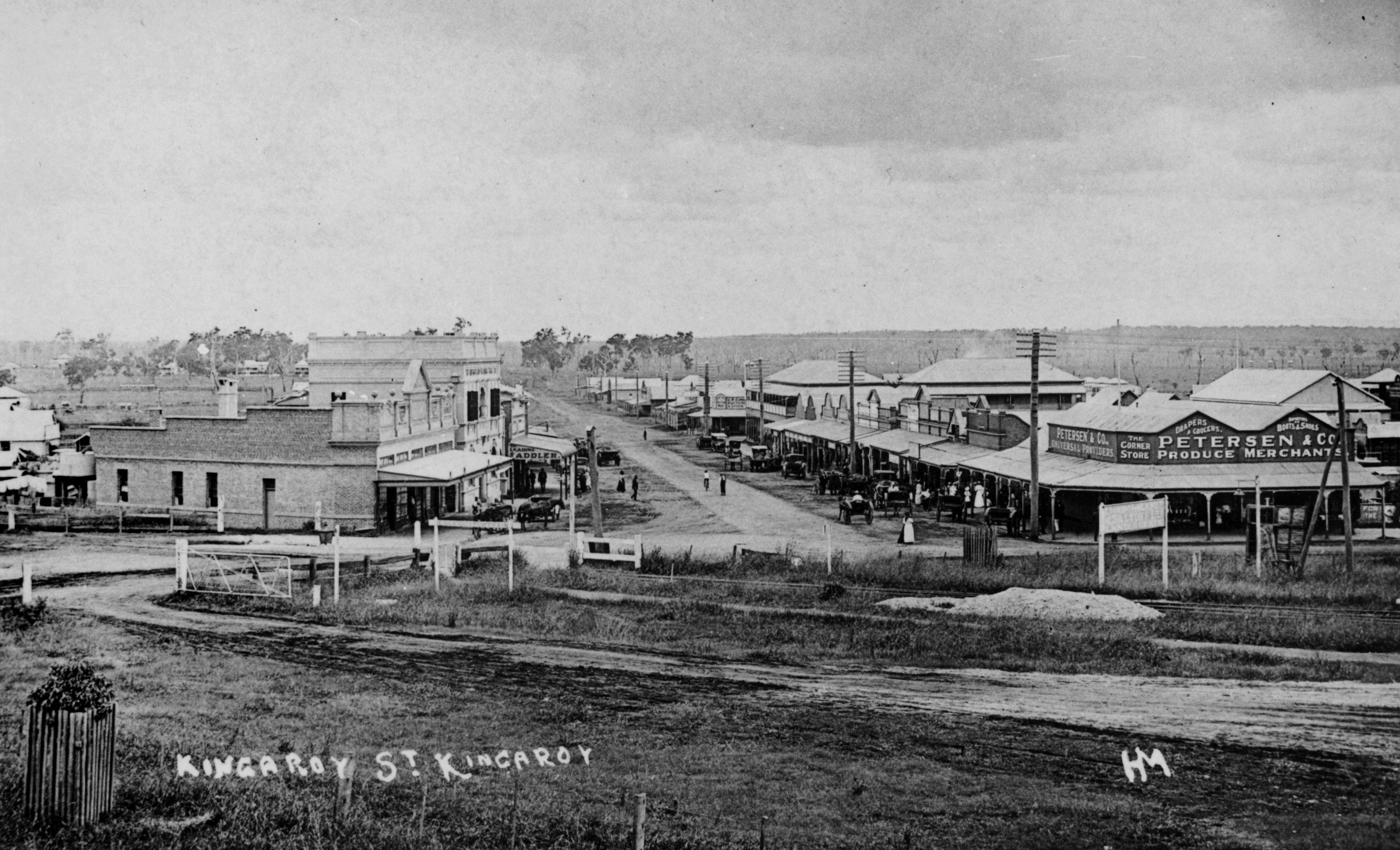
View of Kingaroy Street (ahead) and Haly Street (left and right) from the Kingaroy railway station, circa 1910

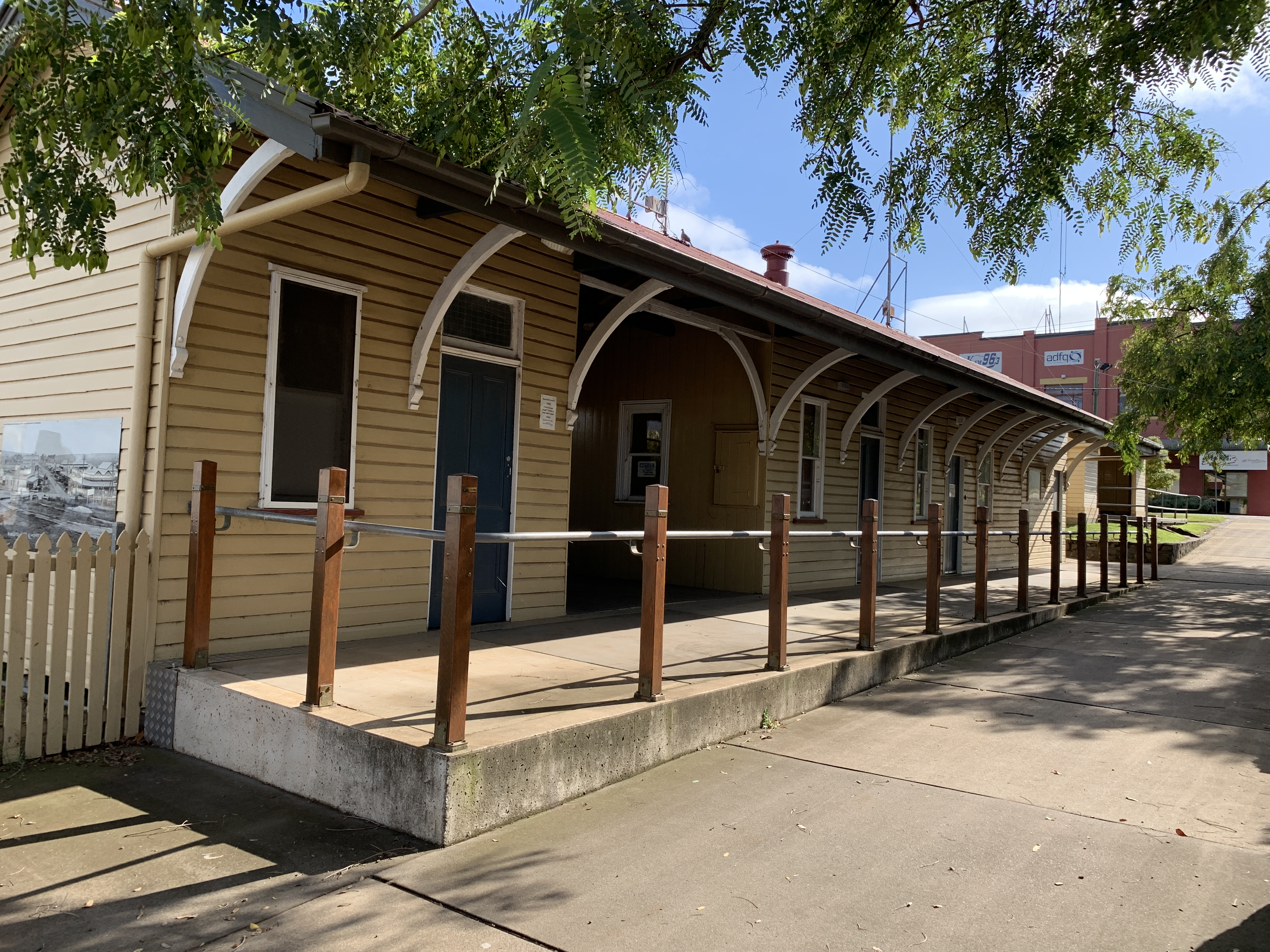
Kingaroy railway station (no longer in use), 2023

The opening of the 5th stage of Nanango railway line to its terminus at Kingaroy railway station in the newly laid-out town of Kingaroy (known as the 56-mile peg) in 1904 led to a land explosion around Kingaroy and the development of Kingaroy as it now exists. Taabinga quickly declined into a ghost town by the end of World War I and today the original Taabinga Homestead and a few outbuildings are all that remain of it. The area opposite Kingaroy Airport is today known as "Taabinga Village" but is really only a suburb of Kingaroy.

Taabinga Village Provisional School opened on 10 August 1897. On 1 January 1909, it became Taabinga Village State School. On 16 July 1961, Taabinga Village State School was closed and pupils transferred to the new Taabinga State School in Kingaroy.

Malar Provisional School opened in 1901. On 1 January 1909, it became Malar State School. There were a number of temporary closures until the school closed permanently in 1955. The school was "via Kingaroy".

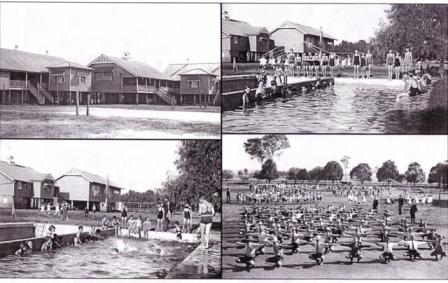
Historic photos of Kingaroy State School

Mount Jones Provisional School opened on 20 January 1902. In 1905, it was renamed Kingaroy Provisional School. On 1 January 1909, it became Kingaroy State School. On 19 February 1918, a secondary department was added, which was discontinued in 1958 when Kingaroy State High School opened.

Logboy Provisional School opened on 22 April 1902. On 1 January 1909, it became Logboy State School. It was at 289 Weens Road (26.51351°S 151.79944°E). In 1911, it was moved to 215–227 Siefert Street, Crawford, and renamed Crawford State School, opening with 29 students.

The first Kingaroy Post Office opened by 1902 (a receiving office had been open from 1895) and was renamed Taabinga Village in 1905, when Kingaroy Railway Station office opened. This was renamed Kingaroy in 1907. The Taabinga Village office closed in 1929.

Erin Vale State School opened in 1911. In 1912 it was renamed Stuart Valley State School. It closed in 1961. It was "via Kingaroy".

Kingaroy's first general hospital opened on 19 November 1914. Prior the only hospital located in Kingaroy was St. Aubyn's private hospital, which opened in 1910. Clydebank Hospital became Kingaroy's second private hospital, which later became a hostel for children. Kingaroy's new public hospital was opened 7 October 1839.

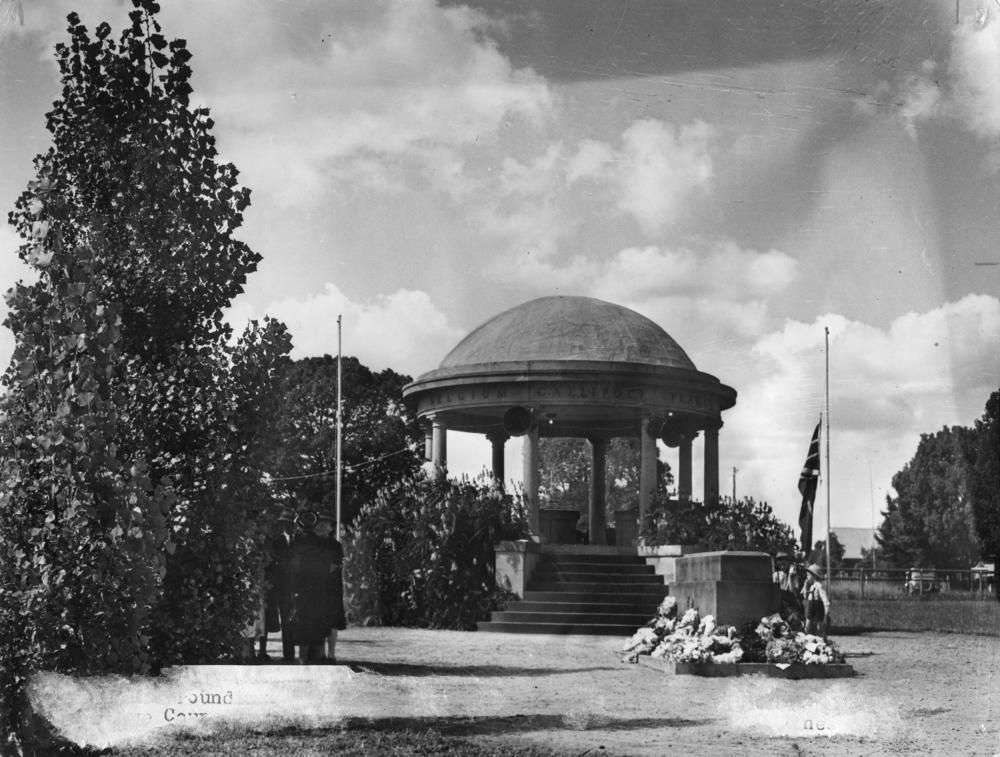
Kingaroy Soldiers' Memorial Rotunda, 1950

The foundation stone of the Kingaroy Soldiers' Memorial Rotunda was laid on 25 April 1922 (ANZAC Day) by the RSL president Sergeant Norman Booth. It was dedicated on 29 June 1932 by Mayor-General Sir Thomas William Glasgow.

The Kingaroy Branch of the Queensland Country Women's Association was established 22 August 1922 with Florence Daphne Youngman of Taabinga Homestead as the first president. In 1926 her husband Arthur Youngman donated land at 122 Kingaroy Street and Charlie Gills built the first rooms. On 24 November 1956 a hall was built at the rear of the rooms to allow for catering of weddings and functions.

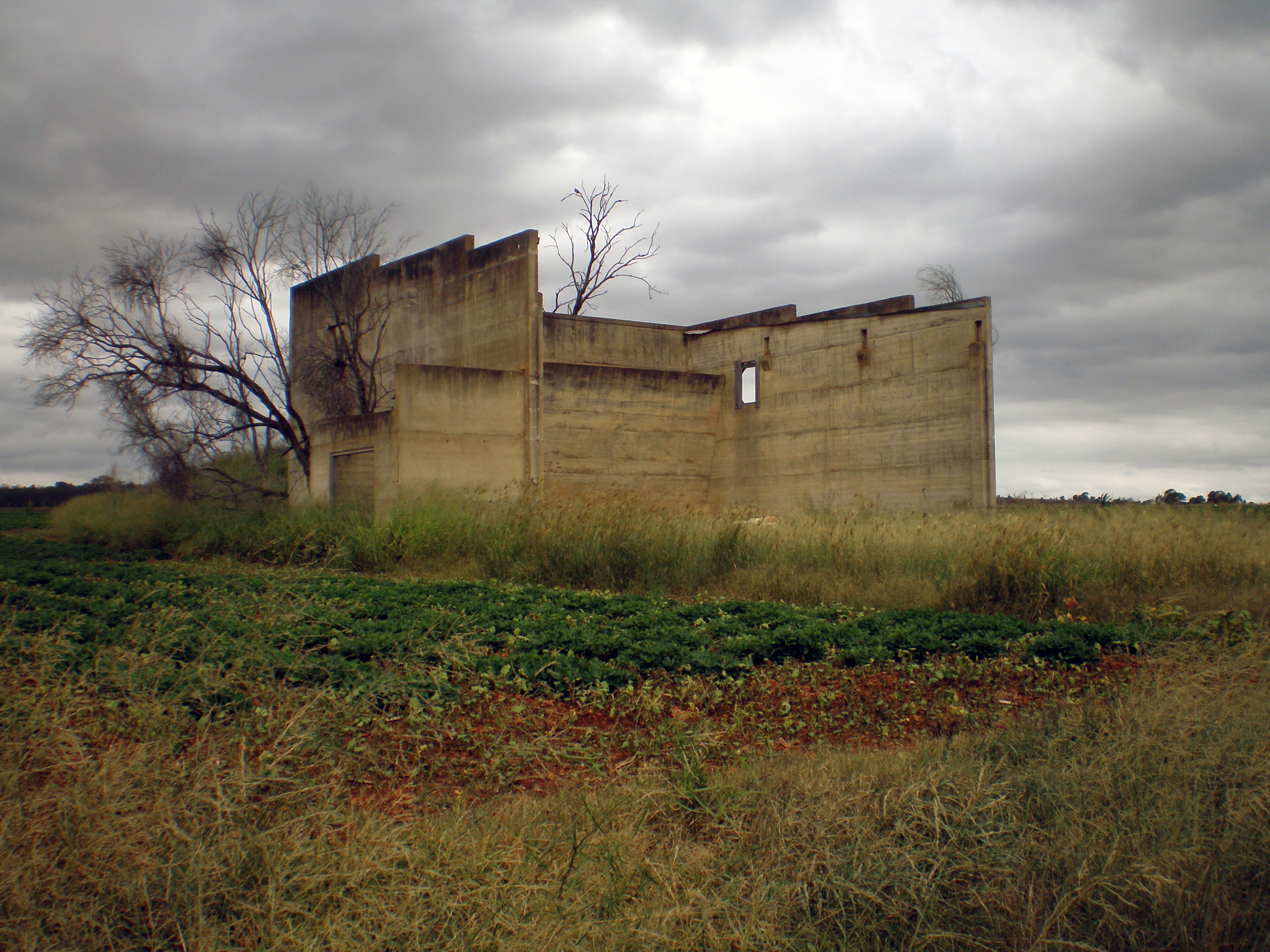
Aircraft firing butts, 2008

St Mary's Catholic Primary School opened in January 1929. In 1980 it merged with St Mary's Catholic Secondary School to become South Burnett Catholic College.

The town's wastewater treatment plant was established circa 1940 with the treated water being discharged into the Stuart River. A major upgrade occurred between 2014 and 2016 resulting greater processing capacity at greater efficiency with treated water now being recycled for use on sporting fields and the golf course.

The Royal Australian Air Force had a significant operational and training presence in the region during the World War II, the first squadrons deploying to the town's airport about mid-1942. At least eight squadrons were based at RAAF Kingaroy then (viz. Nos. 1, 4, 5, 6, 15, 75, 92 and 93 Squadrons), together with No. 3 Initial Training School. Aircraft operated there by the RAAF included Avro Ansons, CAC Wirraways, DAP Beauforts, DH Mosquitos, Curtiss P-40E Kittyhawks and Bristol Beaufighters. Kingaroy R.A.A.F. Post Office was open from 7 August 1942 until 28 February 1946.

The presence of the US Army in Queensland generally and more particularly in Kingaroy created a need to supply them with very large quantities of navy beans (known as baked beans in Australia) which led to widespread planting of navy beans in the Kingaroy area from 1940 with seed supplied by the US Army. Such was the military importance of navy beans that all war-time production of navy beans was done under contract to the Australian Government and subject to the National Security Act. After the war, the industry struggled with a number of issues including tariffs, marketing, processing and being controlled from Brisbane. With the vast majority of bean growers in Queensland being in the Kingaroy area and following the destruction of the processing factory in Toowoomba, local growers decided to form a co-operative based in Kingaroy to process and market the product locally on a site provided by Kingaroy Shire Council who wanted to encourage the project. Since 1993, the cooperative is known as Bean Growers Australia.

St Mary's Catholic Secondary School opened in 1946. In 1980 it merged with St Mary's Catholic Primary School to become South Burnett Catholic College.

Kingaroy State High School opened on 28 January 1958, replacing the secondary department at Kingaroy State School.

South Burnett Catholic College opened in 1980, as the merger of St Mary's Catholic Primary and Secondary Schools.

Kingaroy Christian College opened on 24 April 1984 and closed on 6 May 1999. The college had buried a time capsule on 24 April 1994. On 16 April 2013, former students dug up the time capsule with the assistance of the owners of the former school site. The time capsule contained a number of small items including a floppy disk.

St John's Lutheran Primary School opened on 23 January 1989 with 26 students and 2 teachers. The school was established by relocating the school buildings from the closed Mannuem Creek State School in Mannuem. In 2014 the school expanded to offer junior secondary schooling (Years 7 to 9).

Kingaroy celebrated its centenary in 2004.

Kingaroy is also noted for being the first region in Australia to be placed on Level 7 Water Restrictions, which occurred on 1 October 2007.

In 2017, Kingaroy Magistrates and District Court underwent a $5.3 million refurbishment. The improvements included a full internal and external refurbishment and a new secure interview room for witnesses to give evidence. The courthouse was officially opened on 6 February 2018 by Queensland Attorney-General Yvette D’Ath.

== Demographics ==
Population of Kingaroy
Source	Population (urban centre)	Population (locality)	Notes
2001 census	7,147		
2006 census	7,620		
2011 census	9,586		
2016 census		10,020	
2021 census		10,266	

== Heritage listings ==
Kingaroy has a number of sites listed on the Queensland Heritage Register, including:

- St Michael and All Angels Church, 2–6 Alford Street
- Carroll Cottage, 6 Edward Street
- former Kingaroy Shire Council Chambers (now home to the Kingaroy Regional Art Gallery), 126 Haly Street
- Kingaroy Peanut Silos, 117–131 Haly Street
- Burrandowan Station Homestead, Kingaroy Road, Durong
- Taabinga Homestead, 7 Old Taabinga Road, Haly Creek
- Wylarah, South Burrandowan Road, Ironpot
- former Kingaroy Butter Factory, 67 William Street

Kingaroy also has a number of sites listed on the Local Heritage Register of the South Burnett Regional Council, including:

- Kingaroy Showgrounds – the former Coolabunia railway station and station master's house, pavilions, World War II huts, spectator stands, stables and amenities come under the umbrella of the Showgrounds listing, Youngman Street.

== Education ==
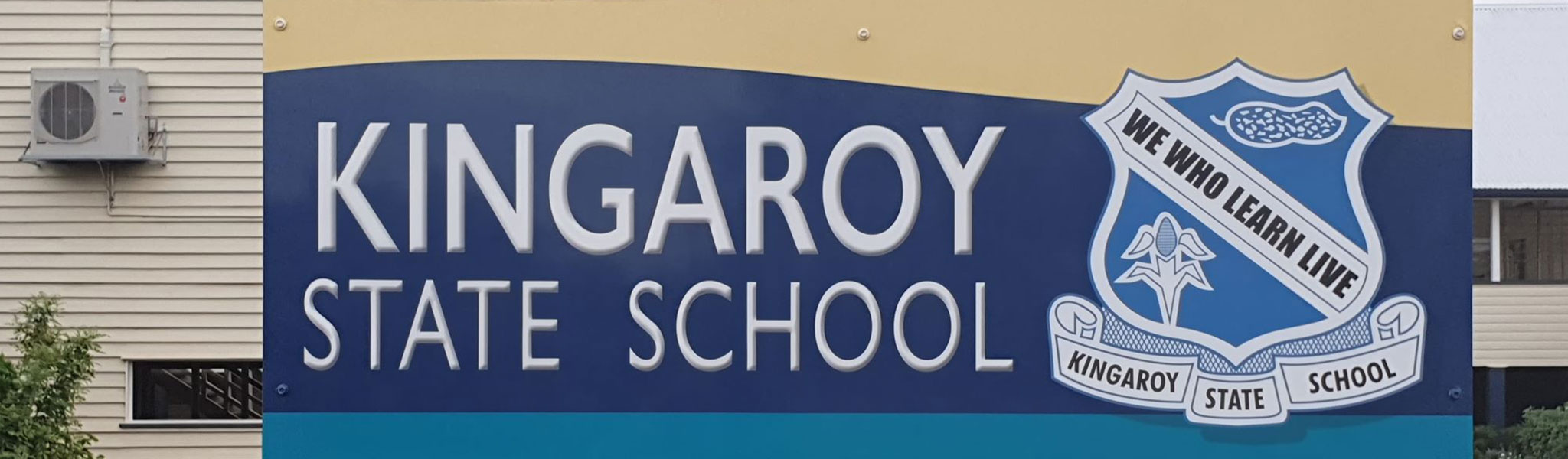
Kingaroy State School, 2022

Kingaroy State School is a government primary (Early Childhood to Year 6) school for boys and girls at 61 Alford Street (26.5403°S 151.8331°E). In 2018, the school had an enrolment of 503 students with 44 teachers (41 full-time equivalent) and 33 non-teaching staff (22 full-time equivalent). It includes a special education program.

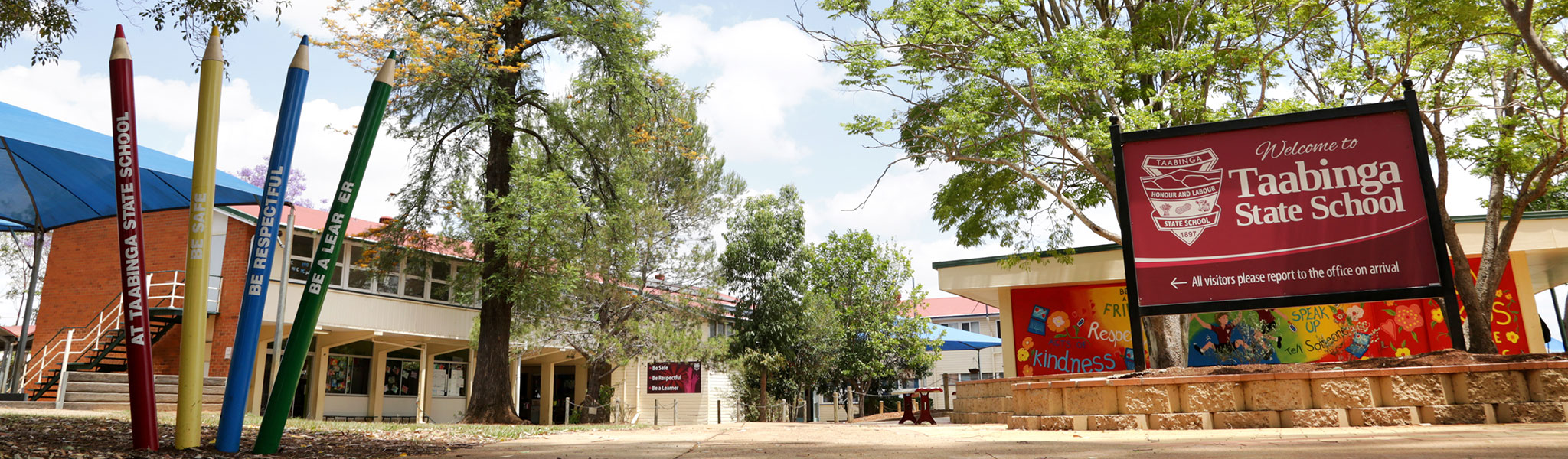
Taabinga State School, 2021

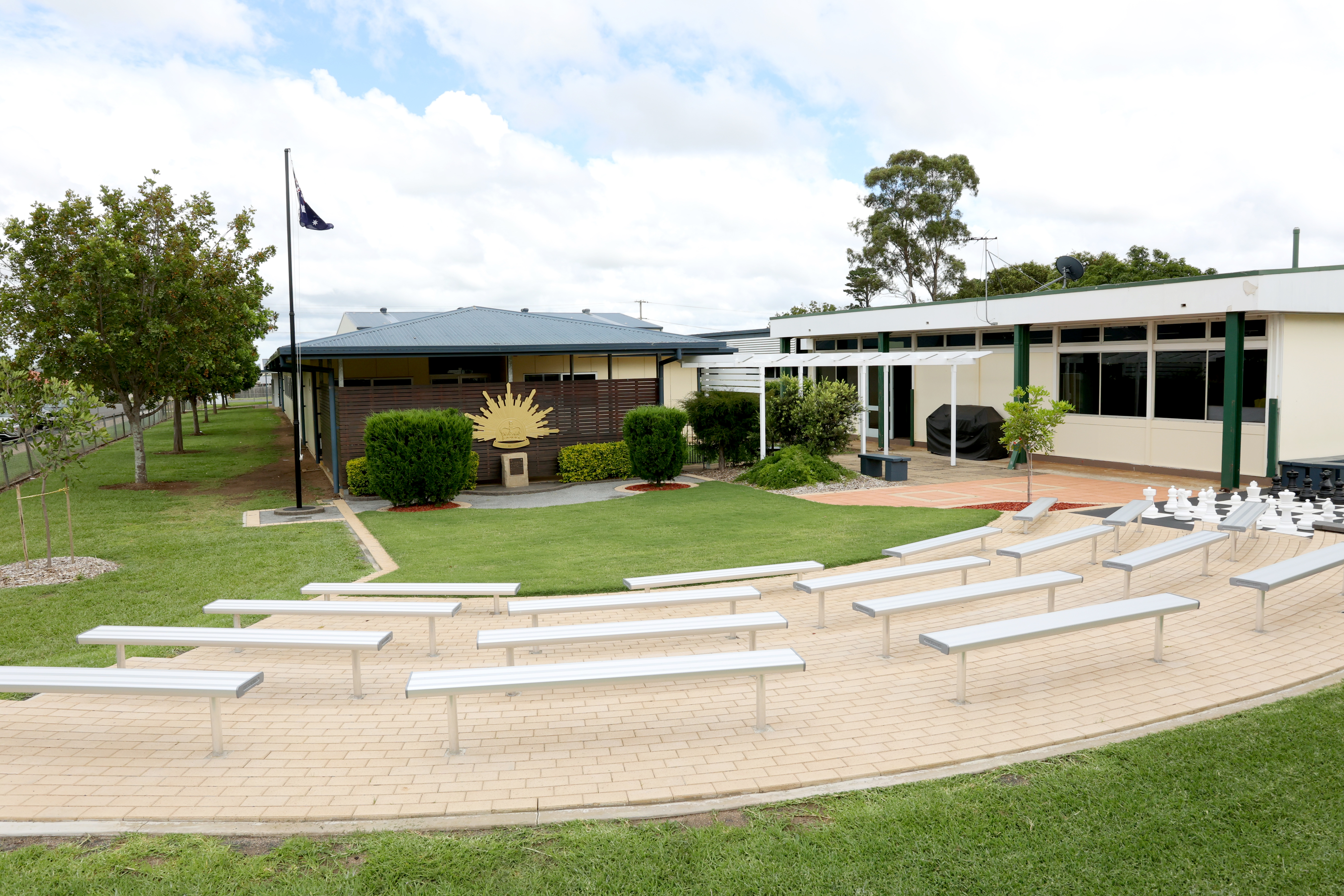
War memorial, Taabinga State School, 2021

Taabinga State School is a government primary (Prep–6) school for boys and girls at Rae Street (26.5563°S 151.8381°E). In 2018, the school had an enrolment of 354 students with 25 teachers (21 full-time equivalent) and 22 non-teaching staff (13 full-time equivalent). It includes a special education program. The school has a war memorial.

Saint Mary's Catholic College is a Catholic primary and secondary (Prep–12) school for boys and girls at 10 Kent Street (26.5346°S 151.8419°E). In 2018, the school had an enrolment of 480 students with 41 teachers (38 full-time equivalent) and 30 non-teaching staff (22 full-time equivalent).

St John's Lutheran School is a private primary and secondary (Prep–9) school for boys and girls at 84–94 Ivy Street (26.5376°S 151.8552°E). In 2018, the school had an enrolment of 432 students with 31 teachers (27 full-time equivalent) and 33 non-teaching staff (24 full-time equivalent).

Kingaroy State High School is a government secondary (7–12) school for boys and girls at Toomey Street (26.5429°S 151.8323°E). In 2018, the school had an enrolment of 999 students with 99 teachers (91 full-time equivalent) and 49 non-teaching staff (35 full-time equivalent). It includes a special education program.

The Kingaroy campus of TAFE Queensland is a technical college on the north-east corner of the Bunya Highway and Geritz Road (26.5708°S 151.8261°E).

== Economy ==
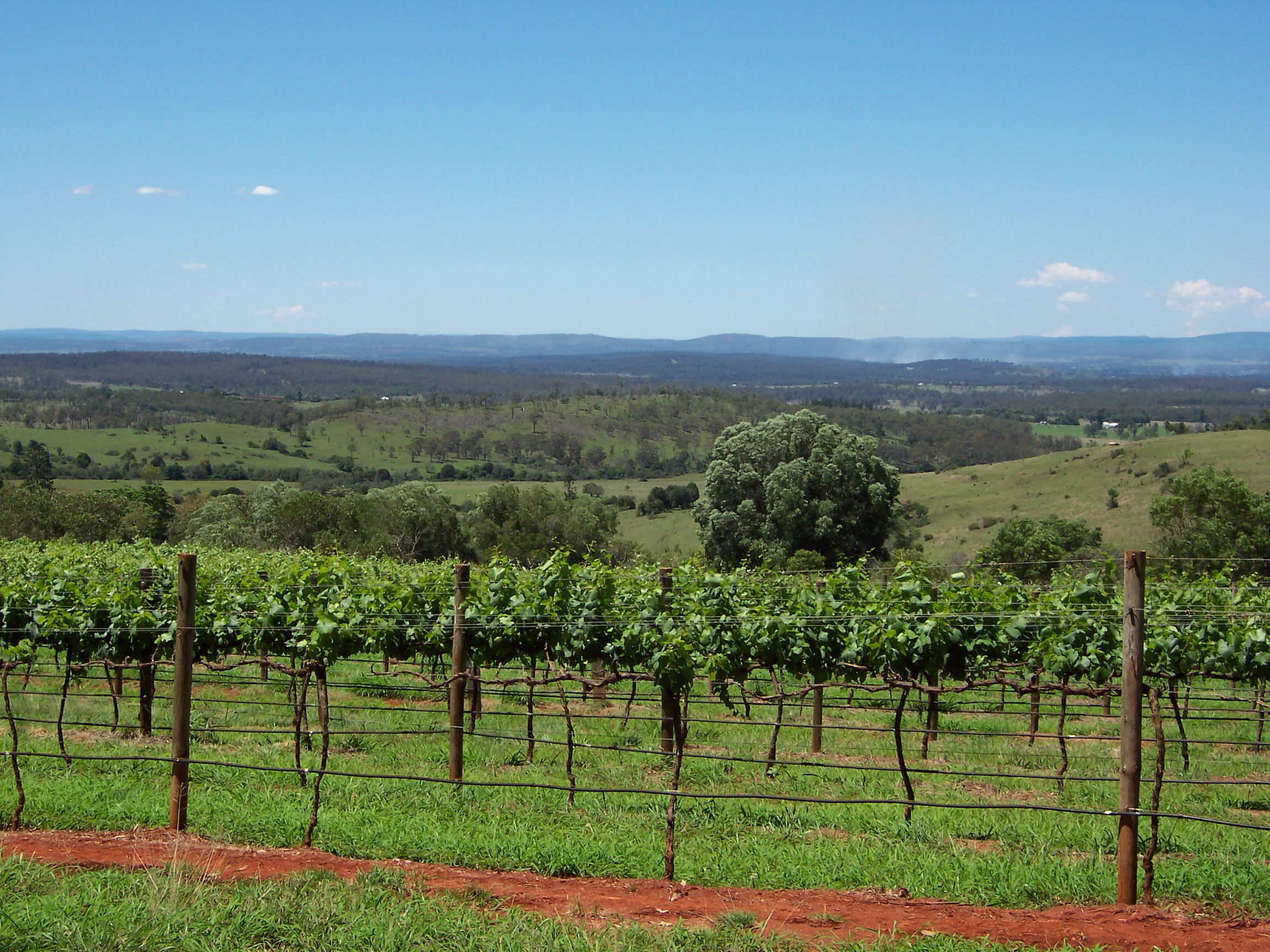
Kingaroy is noted for its rich, red, volcanic soil, seen in the foreground. Its newly established vineyards have enabled the area to benefit from tourism.

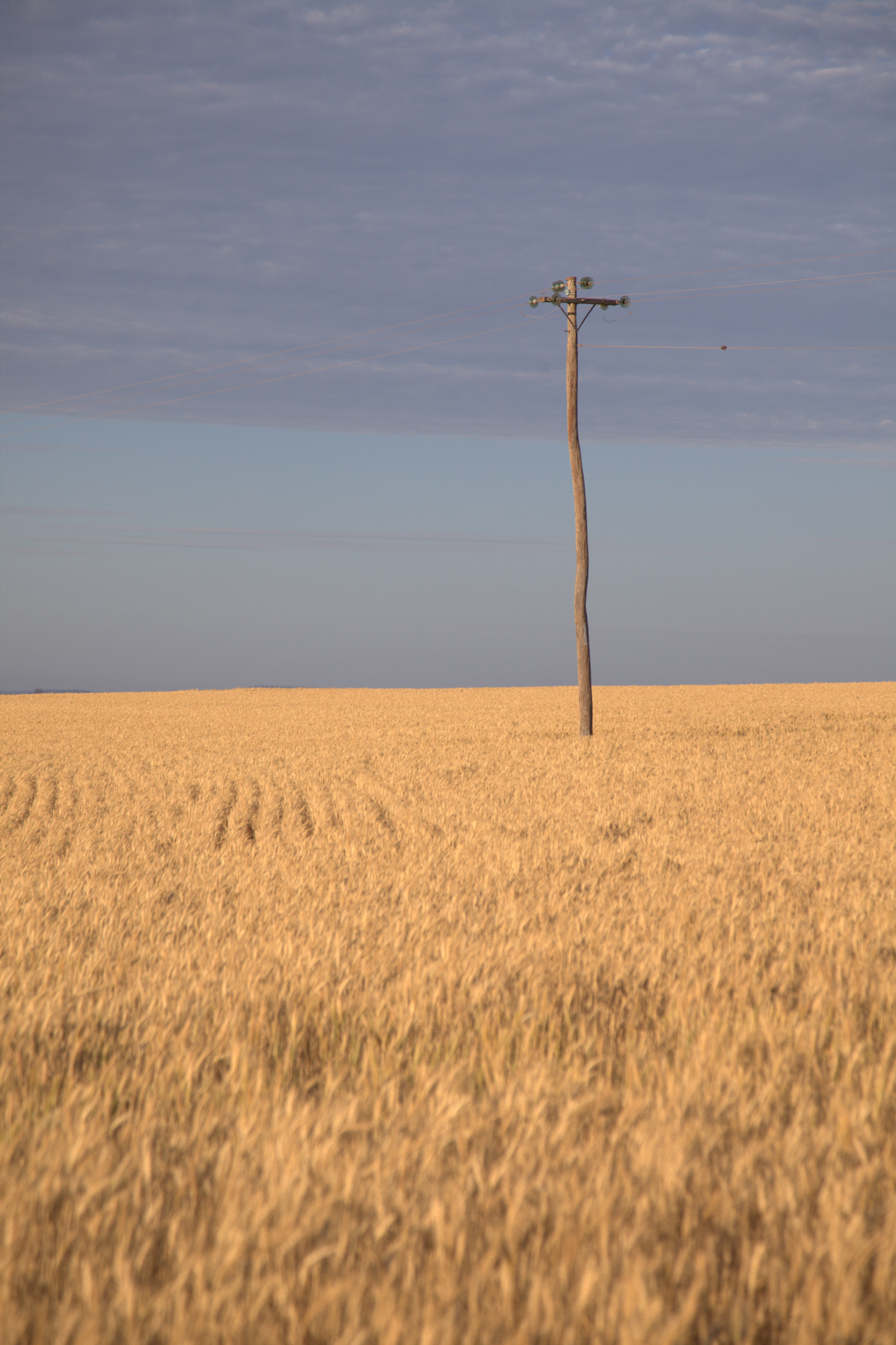
A wheat field in the Kingaroy region

Traditionally, Kingaroy has always been the centre of Australia's peanut and navy bean industries but since the early 1990s it has also developed into one of the twin hubs of the South Burnett's rapidly expanding wine industry (the other hub is at Murgon, Redgate and Moffatdale, 55 kilometres (34 mi) to the north).

Droughts and uncertainty surrounding the region's annual peanut crop led some farmers to diversify and grow grapes. Rich volcanic soil, hot dry summers and cold winters proved to be ideal conditions for wine growing. Quite a number of vineyards were established in the region, and the success of their wine enables the South Burnett region, which includes Kingaroy, to promote the area as a tourist destination. The success of these enterprises has been largely attributed to the scenery of the location, and has benefited the local economy.

Bean Growers Australia is a cooperative association with its headquarters at 82-84 River Road (26.5504°S 151.8289°E) where it has its processing factory. Its members grow a range of beans including soybeans, adzuki beans, navy beans, mungbeans, chickpeas, black eye beans, field peas, linseed and popcorn.

Other than grapes, peanuts and navy beans, other crops commonly grown in the Kingaroy area are sorghum, wheat, maize, sunflowers, citrus fruits and duboisia, a kind of plant often used for pharmaceutical products.

Kingaroy is centred on one of Australia's largest pork producing regions, and since the early 1960s has been home to one of Queensland's largest pig abattoirs, Swickers Kingaroy Bacon Factory.

Hardwood Forestry Plantations have been prominent across the landscape since the early 2000s, having been established on many farms in the region as joint ventures between Landholders and the Queensland Government. The Plantation Forestry Industry is expected to provide employment for many locals in the future.

== Sports ==
Kingaroy has a vibrant sporting life. The town is home to a number of leading sports people including NRL players Chris Sandow and Chris McQueen Wallabies centre/fly-half Berrick Barnes, as well as former Australian cricket test and one day opening batter Matthew Hayden and Southern Stars women's cricket Australian representative bowler Holly Ferling. Kingaroy also has its own golf club, cricket club. Kingaroy Bowls Club has 2 Grass greens and plays on Thursdays and Sundays. Kingaroy & District Tennis Association has 8 synthetic grass courts, and a practice wall. The tennis club holds Thursday night fixtures and other social day matches during the week. It also has a notable speedway track.

Kingaroy has clubs within Australia's four Football codes. Rugby League is the most popular sport, with a rugby league team that participates in the South Burnett Rugby League competition, named the Kingaroy Red Ants.

The town also has two Football (Soccer) teams, Gunners and Wests, that take part in the South Burnett's Football competition. Kingaroy is also home to the South Burnett Thrashers, a Rugby Union team that participates at B Grade level in the strong Darling Downs Rugby Union competition. In 2013, an AFL team, the South Burnett Saints, joined the Darling Downs competition. This is based in Kingaroy and plays at Lyle Vidler Oval. Kingaroy previously had junior and senior AFL teams in the Darling Downs AFL competition, with the Kingaroy Bulldogs senior men's side playing on and off from the early 1980s up until 2006, and the Kingaroy-Nanango Jets junior side playing up until 2009.

The Kingaroy Showgrounds is also home to the Kingaroy Speedway, a 400 metres (440 yards) clay oval. The speedway, which opened in 1968, is run by the South Burnett Speedway Club.

== Culture ==
Kingaroy has a vibrant cultural and social life and is home to an art gallery and several local craft outlets as well as a range of well-maintained and attractive parklands. The South Burnett Regional Council operates a public library in Kingaroy at Glendon Street.

Live entertainment is held regularly at the Returned Services League club as well as several central hotels and in Kingaroy Town Hall. A half-dozen cellardoors are located either in town of very close to it.

The South Burnett Musical Comedy Society (SBMCS) is based in Kingaroy and annually holds a minor production (e.g. a concert) around April/May and a major production (a full theatrical musical) around August to October. The group celebrated its 30th anniversary in 2019.

The South Burnett Community Orchestra (SBCO) is based in Kingaroy and holds two concerts annually, one in June and the other in November. The orchestra is celebrating its 20th anniversary at the 2026 June concert.

== Facilities ==
Kingaroy Police Station is at 11-13 Alford Street (26.5415°S 151.8402°E).

Kingaroy Fire Station is on the southern corner of Kent Street and Edward Street (26.5370°S 151.8394°E).

Kingaroy SES Facility is at 5 Glendon Street (26.5438°S 151.8368°E).

Kingaroy Hospital is a public hospital at 152-176 Youngman Street (26.5322°S 151.8388°E).

Lady Bjelke-Petersen Community Hospital (also known as South Burnett Community Private Hospital) is a private hospital at 31 Markwell Street (26.5429°S 151.8371°E) owned by the Queensland Eye Institute.

Kingaroy Ambulance Station is on the western corner of Kent and Edward Street, opposite the fire station (26.5367°S 151.8391°E).

The Kingaroy Public Library opened in 1945 and had a major refurbishment in 2011.

Kingaroy also has an aerodrome a few kilometres from the centre of town and there is a coach service between Proston and Caboolture on weekdays.

Kingaroy Wastewater Treatment Plant is a sewage treatment plant at 7-33 Hodges Road (26.5532°S 151.8185°E).

The South Burnett Regional Council have a depot at 2 Ivins Street (26.5538°S 151.8281°E).

== Amenities ==
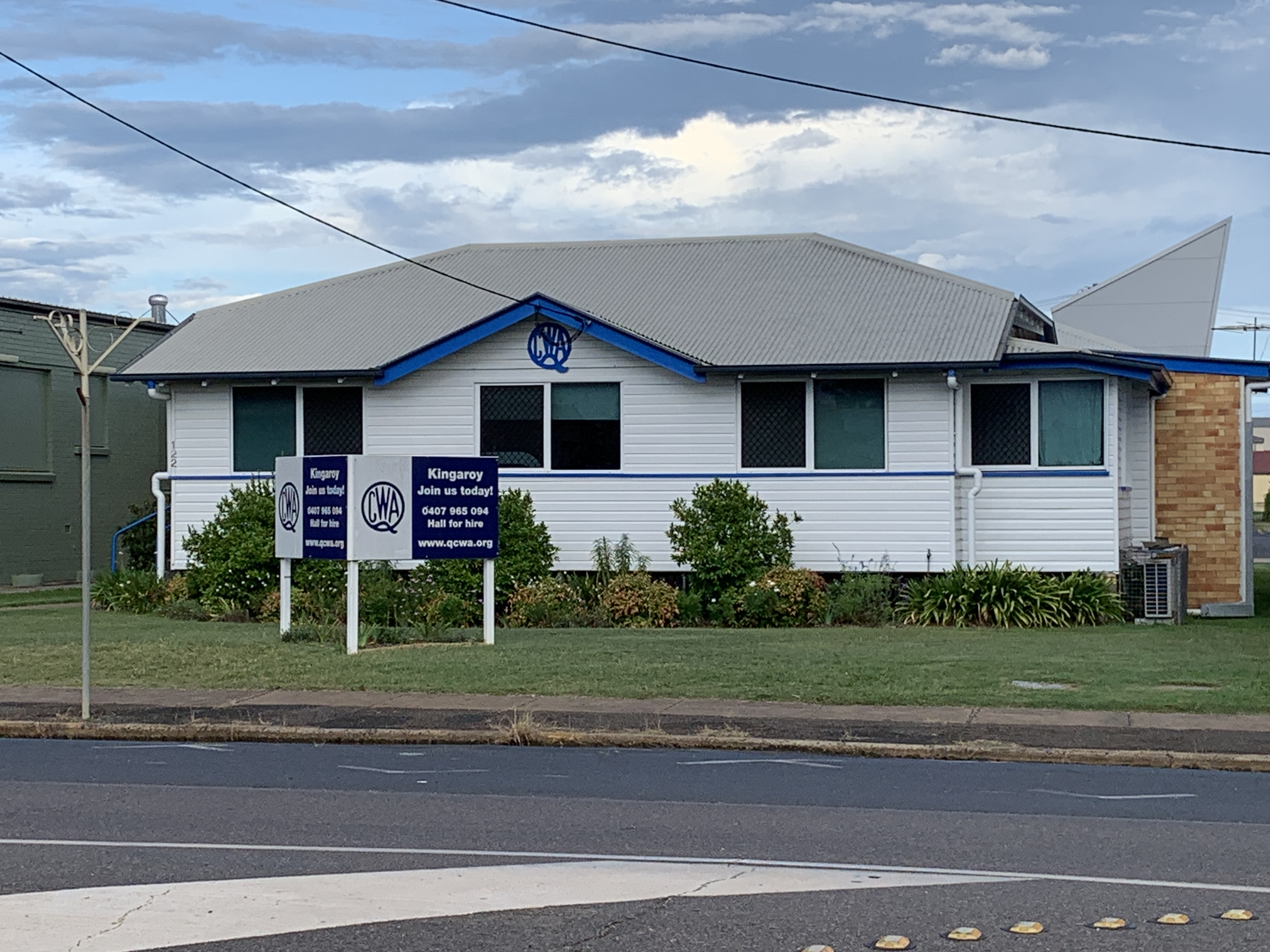
Kingaroy branch of the Queensland Country Women's Association, 2023

Kingaroy Shoppingworld is a shopping centre on the corner of Youngman and Alford Street (26.5417°S 151.8369°E).

The Kingaroy and Kingaroy Twilight branches of the Queensland Country Women's Association meet at the Kingaroy CWA hall at 122-124 Kingaroy Street (26.5422°S 151.8394°E).

Kingaroy Showground is at 41-47 Avoca Street (26.5475°S 151.8295°E).

=== Parks ===
There are a number of parks in the area:

- Adermann Park (26.5367°S 151.8543°E)
- Apex Park (26.5324°S 151.8484°E)
- Belle Street Park (26.5354°S 151.8326°E)
- Bjelke Petersen Recreation Reserve (26.5489°S 151.8310°E)
- Carroll Nature Reserve (26.5305°S 151.8477°E)
- Cowie Drive Park (26.5302°S 151.8574°E)
- Dell Court Park (26.5368°S 151.8595°E)
- Doonkuna Street Park (26.5398°S 151.8590°E)
- Earl Park (26.5381°S 151.8228°E)
- Earle Park Kingaroy (26.5407°S 151.8219°E)
- Fisher Street (26.5249°S 151.8512°E)
- Freemans Nature Park (26.5318°S 151.8531°E)
- Gwalia Court Park (26.5232°S 151.8570°E)
- J A Carroll Park (26.5351°S 151.8435°E)
- Kingaroy Heights Environmental Park (26.5559°S 151.8624°E)
- Memorial Park (26.5393°S 151.8325°E)
- North Street Park (26.5335°S 151.8298°E)
- O'Neill Square (26.5392°S 151.8399°E)
- River Road Park (26.5511°S 151.8358°E)
- Rotary Park (26.5414°S 151.8484°E)
- Sonaree Crescent Park (26.5313°S 151.8621°E)
- Walter Road Park (26.5572°S 151.8395°E)
- Gordonbrook Dam (26.446714°S 151.752929°E)

== Events ==
Regular events include:

- Wine and Food in the Park Festival (held annually on the second Saturday in March)
- Kingaroy Show (held annually each May)
- Burrandowan Picnic Races (held annually each May at Burrandowan since 1922)
- Kingaroy Trail Ride held since 2009 at "Minmore" 36 kilometres (22 mi) from Kingaroy on the Burrandowan road (May 2011)
- Kingaroy Bacon Fest (held annually in August since 2018)
- the week-long UAV Outback Challenge flying robot competition (a week-long event held in September on alternate years)
- Christmas Carnival (annually each December).

== Attractions ==
The Central Business District of the town is dominated by the Peanut Company of Australia's peanut silos (a local landmark).

The Information, Art, and Heritage Precinct is located directly opposite the peanut silos. The complex includes

- the Kingaroy Regional Art Gallery,
- Visitor Information Centre,
- Heritage Museum,
- interpretative arena which highlights local industries.

The Heritage Precinct includes

- Carroll's Cottage (the first building constructed in Kingaroy)
- Carrollee Hotel
- Shire's earliest Council Chambers (built in 1913).

The Kilkivan to Kingaroy Rail Trail follows the old railway line between the two towns. It is 88 kilometres (55 mi) long and passes through Goomeri, Murgon, Wondai, Tingoora, Wooroolin, Memerambi, and Crawford. The trail from Kilkivan to Murgon is unsealed. Queensland's first and longest sealed rail trail section of 44 kilometres (27 mi) from Murgon to Kingaroy is for walkers and cyclists only. Short distances between towns means coffee is never far away.

The town has two lookouts.

- The narrow road to Mt Wooroolin Lookout is not suitable for vehicles towing caravans or trailers. The lookout provides 360 degree views, as well as a grassed area with picnic tables and wood barbecues. There is a 2.4-kilometre (1.5 mi) loop trail for hikers and mountain bikers from Mt Wooroolin Lookout through the nature reserve of endangered eucalypt woodland and dry vine forest. Regent Bowerbirds, Black-breasted buttonquail and Eastern Shriketit can sometimes be sighted.
- Apex Park and Lookout is adjacent to the Carrol Nature Reserve Kokoda Track (refer Amenities). The lookout is accessed by a walking track. Dollar birds, Indian Koel, Rufous whistler, Rufous fantail and the Eastern whipbird can sometimes be sighted.

The Kingaroy Observatory (formerly Maidenwell Observatory) was moved to its new site in Geoff Raph Drive at the airport in early March 2015 and opened for business on 29 June. Kingaroy Observatory is a major tourist attraction for those wanting to eyeball the Universe up close, in large powerful telescopes, under a canopy of stars not affected by light pollution.

The town is situated in the middle of some spectacular scenery, and is popular for bushwalking.

Several wineries are located either in or very close to the town, along with the Booie Range Distillery which opened in 2001 – only the third distillery in Queensland.

Kingaroy is the largest town in the South Burnett and the region's commercial centre, offering all the services, shopping facilities and many of the industries generally expected in much larger centres. The town has its own hotels, motels, caravan parks, bed and breakfasts and cabins; and a range of restaurants, fast food outlets and petrol stations (including 24-hour petrol stations). Unlike many towns of its size, Kingaroy has its own shopping mall that includes Woolworths, Big W, and other retailers.

=== The Big Peanut ===
The Big Peanut is a monument located in Lions Park on the corner of Kingaroy Street and Baron Street. It is considered to be one of Australia's big things. Constructed by scrap metal artist Kane Minogue using old farming machinery from local peanut farms, the 450 kilogram sculpture stands at 3.4 metres tall and has a width of 1.4 metres.

The Big Peanut was installed in Lions Park on 4 November 2021 and was officially unveiled at a community celebration on 2 April 2022 which was also held to recognise the Kingaroy Needs A Big Peanut committee, the sponsors and Minogue. The original mascot from the defunct Kingaroy Peanut Festival was also in attendance. Kingaroy's Peanut Festival was an annual event held from 1959 until it was axed in 2011 following the Queensland floods due to a lack of community support.

Although the idea for such as landmark had regularly been suggested for at least thirty years prior, it wasn't until 2017 when the concept for The Big Peanut garnered substantial support after a social media campaign was launched called "Kingaroy Needs A Big Peanut" which drew support from South Burnett Regional Council. Prior to the installation of The Big Peanut, the landmark was depicted in a 2020 episode of the ABC Kids program Bluey.

In March 2022, a 29-year-old man appeared in court on 15 charges including 12 counts of wilful damage by graffiti after he used spray paint to vandalise The Big Peanut and other local sites across Kingaroy between 3 January 2022 and 10 January 2022. He was ordered to pay restitution, complete 40 hours of unpaid graffiti removal work and also fined $250 for drug offences.

== Notable people ==
- Charles Adermann, politician
- Evan Adermann, politician
- Matt Ballin, rugby league player
- Berrick Barnes, rugby league and rugby union player
- Florence Bjelke-Petersen, politician and writer
- Joh Bjelke-Petersen, 31st Premier of Queensland
- Dave Brown, rugby league player
- Taliqua Clancy, beach volleyball player
- Jim Edwards, politician
- Bill Feldman, policeman and politician
- Holly Ferling, cricket player
- Deb Frecklington, politician
- Matthew Hayden, cricket player
- Ellen Kent Hughes, doctor
- Bob Irwin, naturalist and father of Steve Irwin
- Kelvin Kerkow, lawn bowls player and author
- David Jull, politician
- Don Livingstone, politician
- Brittany Lauga, politician and town planner
- George Logan, politician
- Ian Macfarlane, politician
- Chris McQueen, rugby league player
- Trevor Perrett, politician
- Colin Petersen, musician and music producer
- Carl Rackemann, cricket player
- Chris Sandow, rugby league player
- Brad Tessmann, rugby league player
- Robyn Thorn, swimmer
- Esikeli Tonga, rugby league player
- Willie Tonga, rugby league player
- Warren Truss, politician, 16th Deputy Prime Minister of Australia
- Jack Venman, pastoralist
