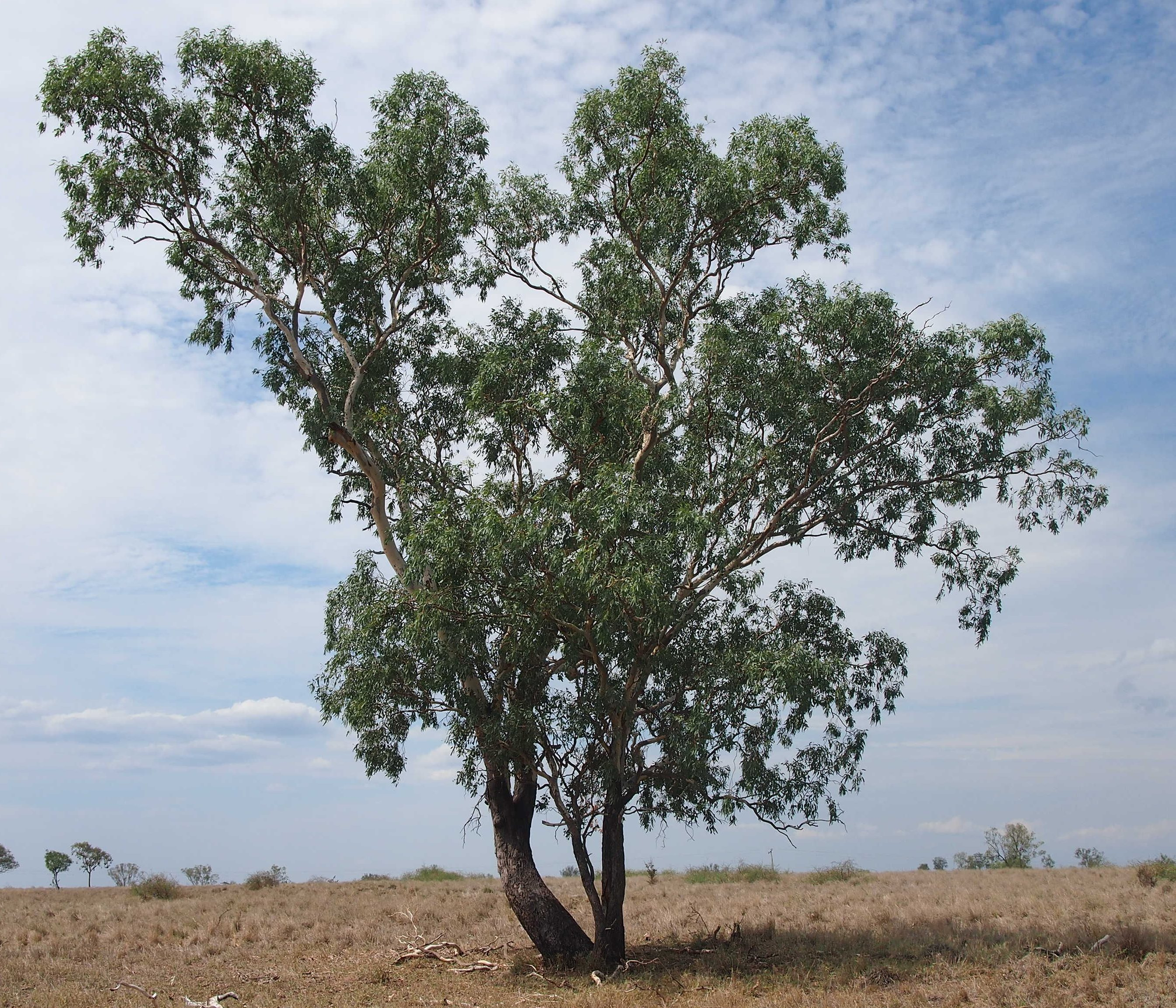
- Eucalyptus orgadophila on Carnarvon Station Reserve

Conservation status
- Near Threatened (IUCN 3.1)

Scientific classification
- Kingdom: Plantae
- Clade: Tracheophytes
- Clade: Angiosperms
- Clade: Eudicots
- Clade: Rosids
- Order: Myrtales
- Family: Myrtaceae
- Genus: Eucalyptus
- Species: E. orgadophila

Binomial name
- Eucalyptus orgadophila Maiden & Blakely

= Eucalyptus orgadophila =

Mountain coolibah

Species of eucalyptus

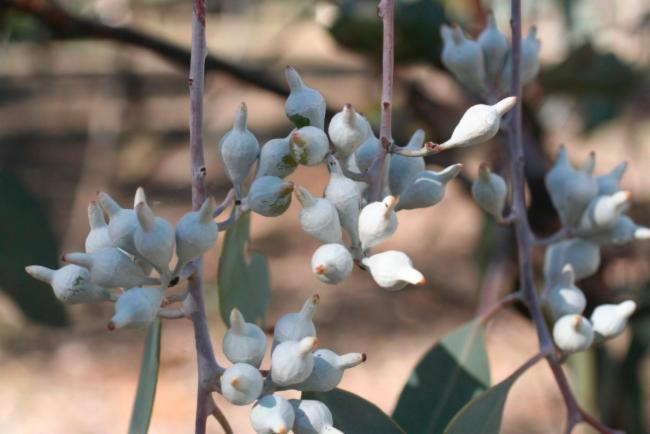
Flower buds

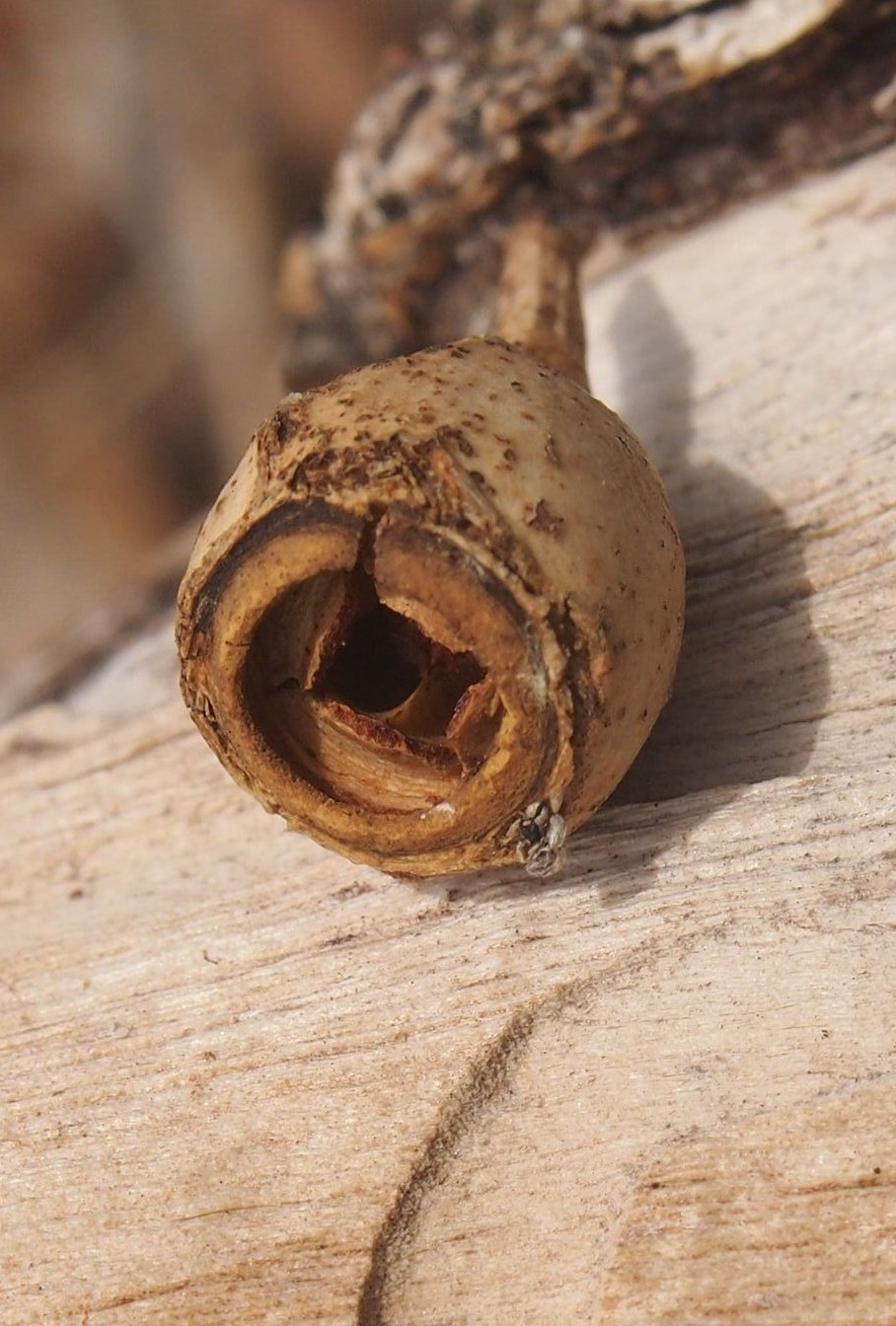
Fruit

Eucalyptus orgadophila, commonly known as mountain coolibah, is a species of medium-sized tree that is endemic to Queensland. It has rough, fibrous or flaky bark on the lower trunk, smooth white to greyish above, lance-shaped adult leaves, flower buds in groups of seven, white flowers and cup-shaped to barrel-shaped fruit.

== Description ==
Eucalyptus orgadophila is a tree that typically grows to a height of 15–20 m (49–66 ft) and forms a lignotuber. It has rough, grey, flaky or fibrous bark on the lower trunk, smooth white to greyish bark above. Young plants and coppice regrowth have dull, bluish, egg-shaped to almost round leaves that are 30–60 mm (1.2–2.4 in) long and 18–40 mm (0.71–1.57 in) wide. Adult leaves are the same shade of dull bluish to greyish green on both sides, lance-shaped, 65–180 mm (2.6–7.1 in) long and 10–25 mm (0.39–0.98 in) wide, tapering to a petiole 10–22 mm (0.39–0.87 in) long. The flower buds are arranged on the end of branchlets in groups of seven on a branching peduncle 8–16 mm (0.31–0.63 in) long, the individual buds on pedicels 5–9 mm (0.20–0.35 in) long. Mature buds are oval to pear-shaped, 7–9 mm (0.28–0.35 in) long and 4–6 mm (0.16–0.24 in) wide with a rounded to beaked operculum. Flowering occurs between February and September and the flowers are white. The fruit is a woody, cup-shaped to barrel-shaped capsule 7–11 mm (0.28–0.43 in) long and 6–10 mm (0.24–0.39 in) wide with the valves below the level of the rim.

== Taxonomy ==
Eucalyptus orgadophila was first formally described in 1928 by Joseph Maiden and William Blakely in Maiden's book, A Critical Revision of the Genus Eucalyptus. The type material was collected by Cyril Tenison White near Cooranga in 1925. The specific epithet is from ancient Greek meaning "a meadow or well-watered, fertile spot" and "loving".

== Distribution and habitat ==
Mountain coolibah grows in woodland, often in pure stand, on ridges and hills in eastern Queensland, from south of the Cape York Peninsula to near Warwick.

== Conservation status ==
This eucalypt is classified as "least concern" under the Queensland Government Nature Conservation Act 1992. The IUCN Red List assesses the species as Near Threatened.

== See also ==
- List of Eucalyptus species
