= Ironpot, Queensland (South Burnett Region) =

Ironpot
- Town
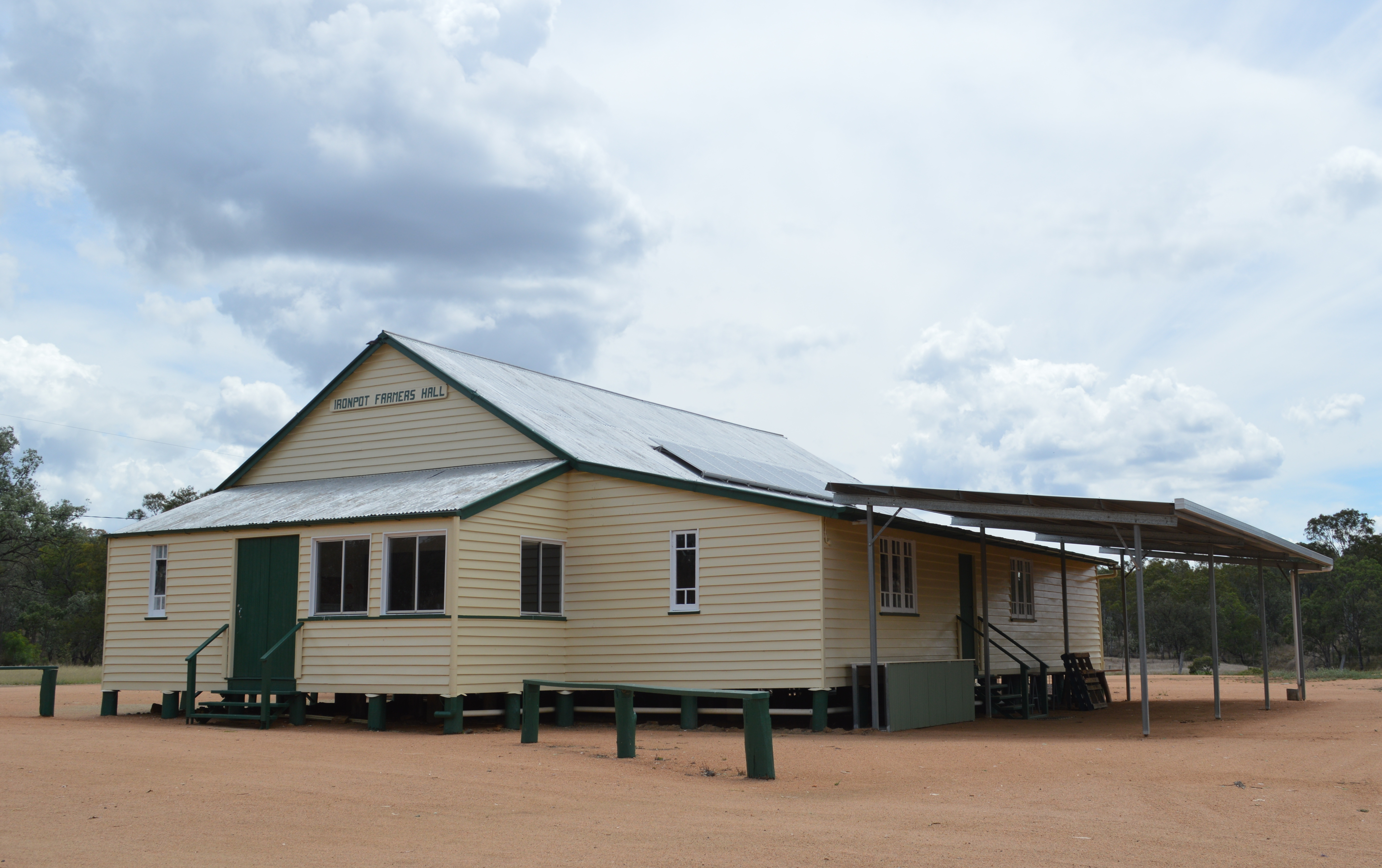
- Farmers hall at Ironpot

- Interactive map of Ironpot
- Coordinates: 26.5913°S 151.4302°E
- Country: Australia
- State: Queensland
- LGA: South Burnett Region
- Location: 59.3 km (36.8 mi) W of Kingaroy; 159 km (99 mi) NNW of Toowoomba; 163 km (101 mi) NW of Brisbane

Government
  - State electorate: Nanango
  - Federal division: Maranoa

Area
  - Total: 322.1 km^{2} (124.4 sq mi)

Population
  - Total: 44 (2021 census)
  - Density: 0.1366/km^{2} (0.354/sq mi)
- Time zone: UTC+10:00 (AEST)
- Postcode: 4610
Localities around Ironpot
Chahpingah	Chahpingah	Chahpingah
Diamondy	Ironpot	Mannuem
Diamondy	Diamondy	Boyneside

Ironpot is a rural locality in the South Burnett Region, Queensland, Australia. In the 2021 census, the locality of Ironpot had a population of 44 people.

== Geography ==
Craig Range, part of the Great Dividing Range, forms the western boundary of the locality. The ranges include two mountains in Ironpot:

- Boomerang Mountain (26.6234°S 151.3986°E) 648 metres (2,126 ft) above sea level
- Mount Mahen (26.6858°S 151.3949°E) 730 metres (2,400 ft) above sea level

The western edge of the locality is within the protected area of the Diamondy State Forest (26.596°S 151.343°E). Apart from the forest, the predominant land use is grazing on native vegetation with a small amount of crop-growing.

== History ==
There is evidence the area was referred to as Tinpot in some early sources.

Ironpot Creek State School opened on 7 February 1916. It closed temporarily in 1926. It closed permanently on 31 December 1974. It was on a 3-acre (1.2 ha) site on the western corner of Ironpot Road and McGills Road (26.5826°S 151.3885°E).

Jarail Creek State School operated from c.1916-c.1935 and from 1950 to 1978 at 642 Jarail Road, Ironpot. It was originally known as Jarail Creek Provisional School and operated on a half time basis at a different site until c.1935. A building was moved to the newe Jarail Road site which had originally been built at Kinleymore State School, was moved to Gordonbrook South State School which closed in 1945, and then finally moved to Jarail Creek in 1949 ready for the reopening in 1950.

Nearby Mount Mahen Provisional School opened on 22 July 1925, closed briefly approximately February 1929, reopening 11 June 1929 and closed permanently on 11 February 1930. The building burned down in the 1930s. Children from the Hunter family formed most of the small enrolments recorded.

== Demographics ==
In the 2011 census, the locality of Ironpot had a population of 285 people.

In the 2016 census, the locality of Ironpot had a population of 45 people.

In the 2021 census, the locality of Ironpot had a population of 44 people.

== Heritage listings ==
Ironpot has a number of heritage-listed sites, including:

- Wylarah Homestead, South Burrandowan Road (26.6343°S 151.456°E)

== Economy ==
There are a number of homesteads in the locality, including:

- Bungara (26.6385°S 151.4141°E)
- Fairfield (26.5712°S 151.3989°E)
- Greystonlea (26.5653°S 151.4382°E)
- Hidden Vale (26.6033°S 151.3833°E)
- Jumma (26.5867°S 151.5310°E)
- Kameruka (26.6228°S 151.4205°E)
- Pine View (26.6014°S 151.4170°E)
- Sarum (26.6216°S 151.4318°E)
- Stoneleigh (26.5789°S 151.3756°E)
- Warragai (26.5504°S 151.4252°E)
- Werona (26.5497°S 151.3783°E)
- Wylarah (26.6341°S 151.4559°E)
- Wylora (26.6341°S 151.4560°E)

== Education ==
There are no schools in Ironpot. The nearest government primary schools are Kumbia State School in Kumbia to the south-east and Durong South State School in Durong to the north-west. The nearest government secondary schools are Kingaroy State High School (to Year 12) in Kingaroy to the east, Bell State School (to Year 10) in Bell to the south, and Jandowae State School (to Year 10) in Jandowae to the south-west.

== Amenities ==
Ironpot Farmers Hall is on Jarail Road (26.6134°S 151.4294°E). It is used for community functions.
