= Chahpingah, Queensland =

Chahpingah
- Suburb
- Interactive map of Chahpingah
- Coordinates: 26.4719°S 151.3775°E
- Country: Australia
- State: Queensland
- LGA: South Burnett Region
- Location: 59.4 km (36.9 mi) WNW of Kingaroy; 128 km (80 mi) N of Dalby; 174 km (108 mi) NNW of Toowoomba; 262 km (163 mi) NW of Brisbane

Government
  - State electorate: Nanango
  - Federal division: Maranoa

Area
  - Total: 417.5 km^{2} (161.2 sq mi)

Population
  - Total: 26 (2021 census)
  - Density: 0.0623/km^{2} (0.1613/sq mi)
- Time zone: UTC+10:00 (AEST)
- Postcode: 4610
Suburbs around Chahpingah
Durong	Durong	Ballogie
Darr Creek	Chahpingah	Dangore
Diamondy	Ironpot	Mannuem

Chahpingah is a rural locality in the South Burnett Region, Queensland, Australia. In the 2021 census, Chahpingah had a population of 26 people.

== Geography ==
The Great Dividing Range forms the south-western boundary of the locality. Piper Dodge Mountain is in the south-west of the locality (26.5604°S 151.2973°E), rising 599 metres (1,965 ft) above sea level. The locality is within the North East Coast drainage basin within the catchment of the Burnett River.

The Boyne River enters the locality from the south-east (Ironpot / Mannuem) and flows north-west through the locality, exiting to the north-east (Durong).

The Chinchilla–Wondai Road runs along part of the northern boundary.

The Diamondy State Forest is in the south-west of the locality extending into the neighbouring localities of Darr Creek and Diamondy. Apart from this protected area, the land use is predominantly grazing on native vegetation with some crop growing.

== History ==
The Burrandowan Picnic Race Club was established on 27 November 1921 by 11 local men. The first race meeting was held on 13 May 1922.

The first meeting was held on the 13th May, 1922 at the present site. Only grass fed horses, which had been paddocked under supervision for one month prior to the race, were eligible, and owners and jockeys had to be Club members. Membership was half a guinea, luncheon was 1/6 and afternoon tea was 9 pence.

== Demographics ==
In the 2016 census, Chahpingah had a population of 29 people.

In the 2021 census, Chahpingah had a population of 26 people.

== Education ==
There are no schools in Chahpingah. The nearest government primary schools are:

- Durong South State School in neighbouring Durong to the north-west
- Burra Burri State School in Burra Burri to the west
- Kumbia State School in Kumbia to the south-east
- Crawford State School in Crawford to the east
- Tingoora State School in Tingoora to the north-east

The nearest government secondary schools are:

- Jandowae State School (to Year 10) in Jandowae to the south-west
- Proston State School (to Year 10) in Proston to the north-east
- Kingaroy State High School (to Year 12) in Kingaroy to the east

However, students in the west of Chahpingah are too distant to attend Kingaroy State High School, so for Year 12 education, the alternatives are distance education and boarding school.

== Amenities ==
Burrandowan Racecourse is on the southern side of Burra Burri Road (26.4694°S 151.3714°E).

== Events ==
The Burrandown Picnic Races are held annually at the racecourse.
