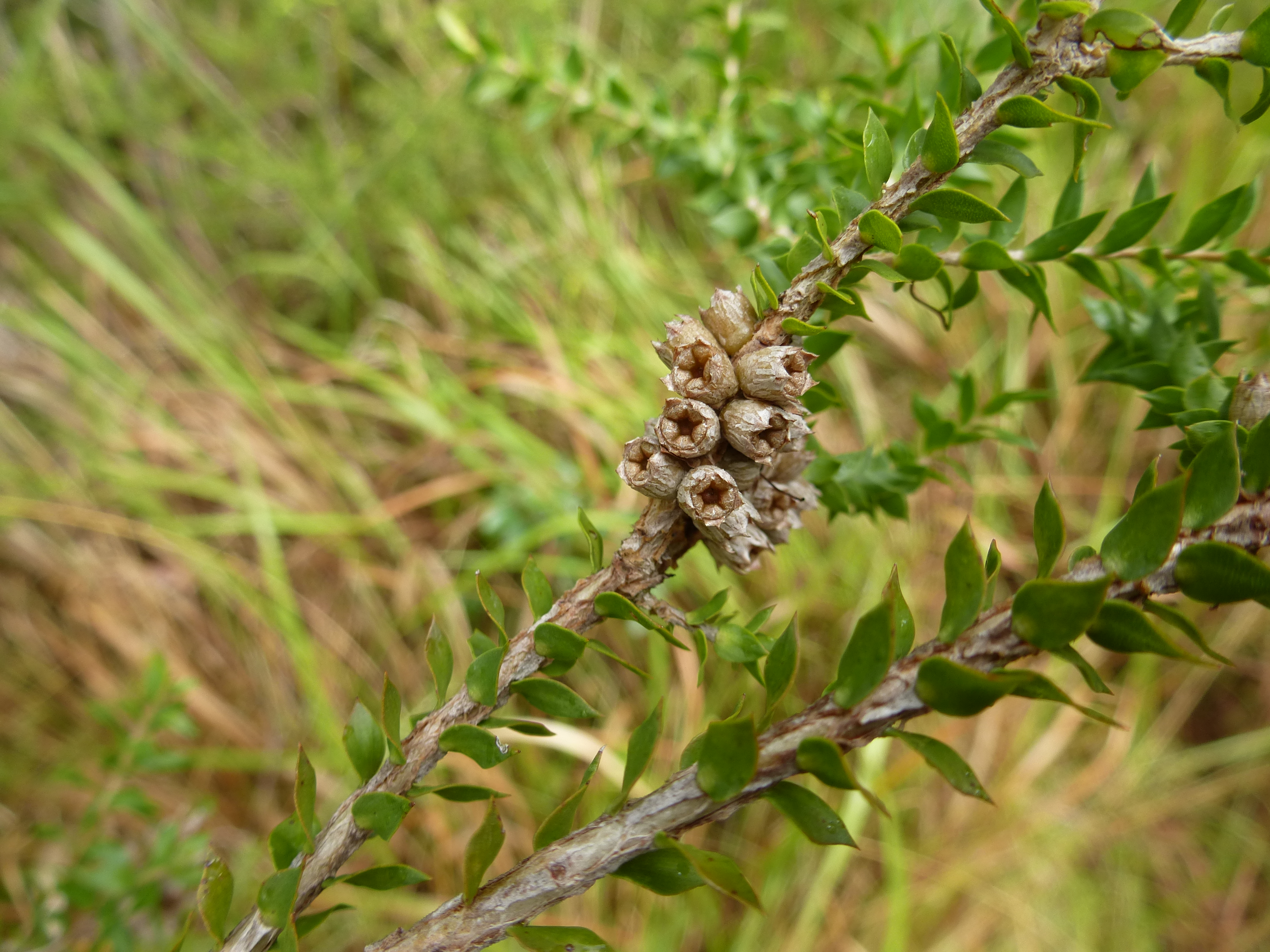
- Fruit

Scientific classification
- Kingdom: Plantae
- Clade: Embryophytes
- Clade: Tracheophytes
- Clade: Spermatophytes
- Clade: Angiosperms
- Clade: Eudicots
- Clade: Rosids
- Order: Myrtales
- Family: Myrtaceae
- Genus: Melaleuca
- Species: M. lophocoracorum

Binomial name
- Melaleuca lophocoracorum A.J.Ford, Craven & Brophy

= Melaleuca lophocoracorum =

Species of flowering plant

Melaleuca lophocoracorum is a plant in the family Myrtaceae and is endemic to a small area in the Ravenshoe State Forest, near Ravenshoe in Queensland, Australia. It is a species of shrub or small tree with twisted leaves and spikes of cream-coloured flowers in summer.

== Description ==
Melaleuca lophocoracorum is a shrub or small tree that typically grows to a height of up to 10 m (30 ft). Its leaves are arranged alternately, 2.8–8.5 mm (0.1–0.3 in) long, 2.7–3.8 mm (0.11–0.15 in) wide, egg-shaped, twisted, tapering to a sharp but not prickly point.

The flowers are cream-coloured and arranged in spikes on the ends of branches that continue to grow after flowering and also on the sides of the branches. The spikes are up to 18 mm (0.7 in) in diameter, 25 mm (1 in) long and contain 3 to 9 groups of flowers in threes. The stamens are arranged in five bundles around the flower with 15 to 25 stamens per bundle. Flowers appear in December and January and are followed by fruit that are woody capsules 2.6–3.1 mm (0.10–0.12 in) long. The fruit retains the seeds for more than 3 years or until the plant is burned or the part bearing the fruit dies. The sepals remain as teeth around the edge of the fruit, usually for more than a year.

This species is similar to Melaleuca squamophloia and Melaleuca styphelioides.

== Taxonomy and naming ==
Melaleuca lophocoracorum was discovered in 2012 and first formally described in 2013 by Andrew James Ford, Lyn Craven and Joseph Brophy in Telopea from a specimen collected on the walking track to Bally Knob near Ravenshoe. The specific epithet (lophocoracorum) is arbitrarily derived from the Ancient Greek word lophos meaning 'ridge' or 'crest' and corax meaning 'raven', because "hoe" in "Ravenshoe" originally meant "ridge" or "crest of a hill", so that lophocoracorum is equivalent to Ravenshoe.

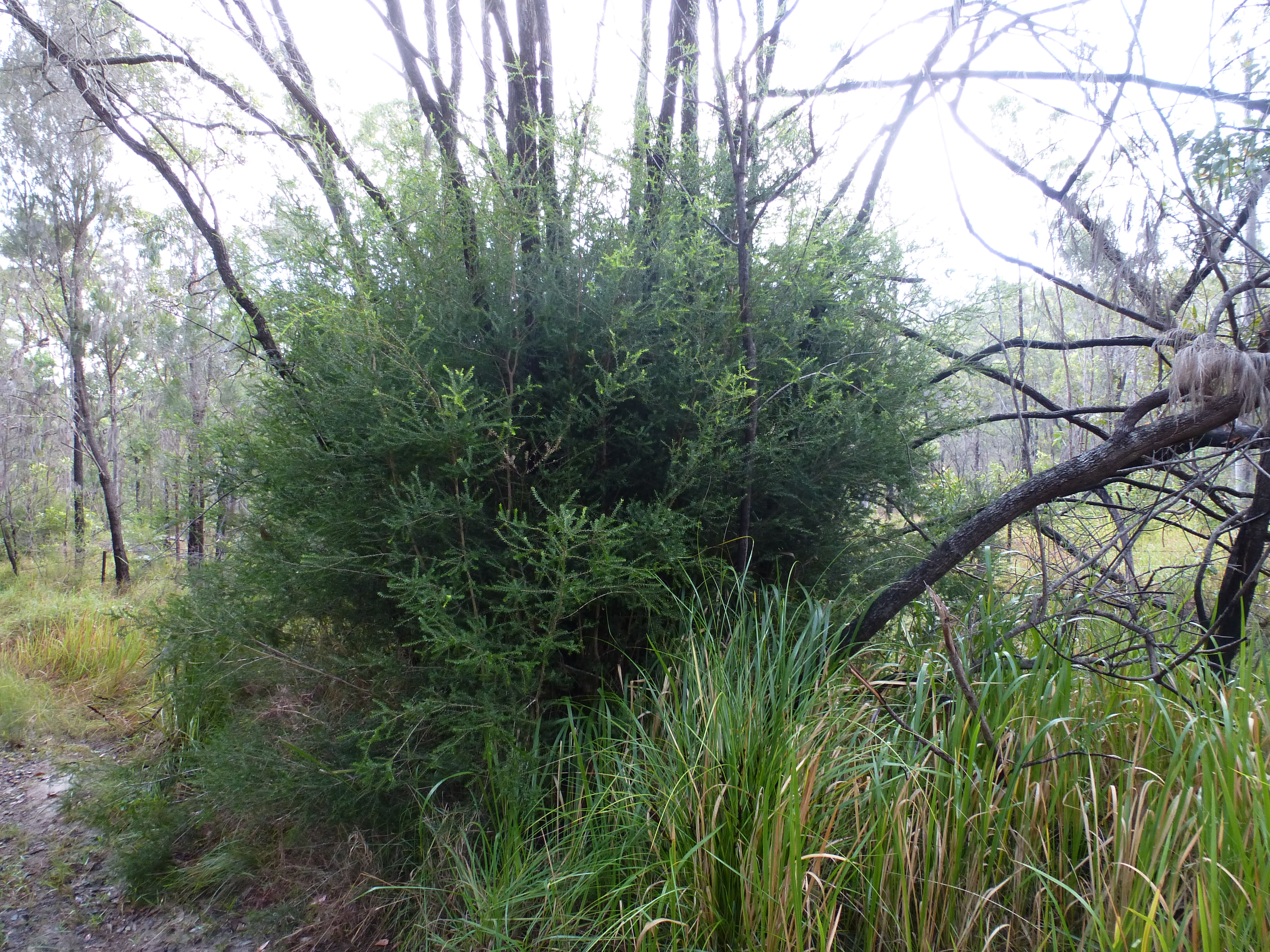
Habit after fire, near Ravenshoe

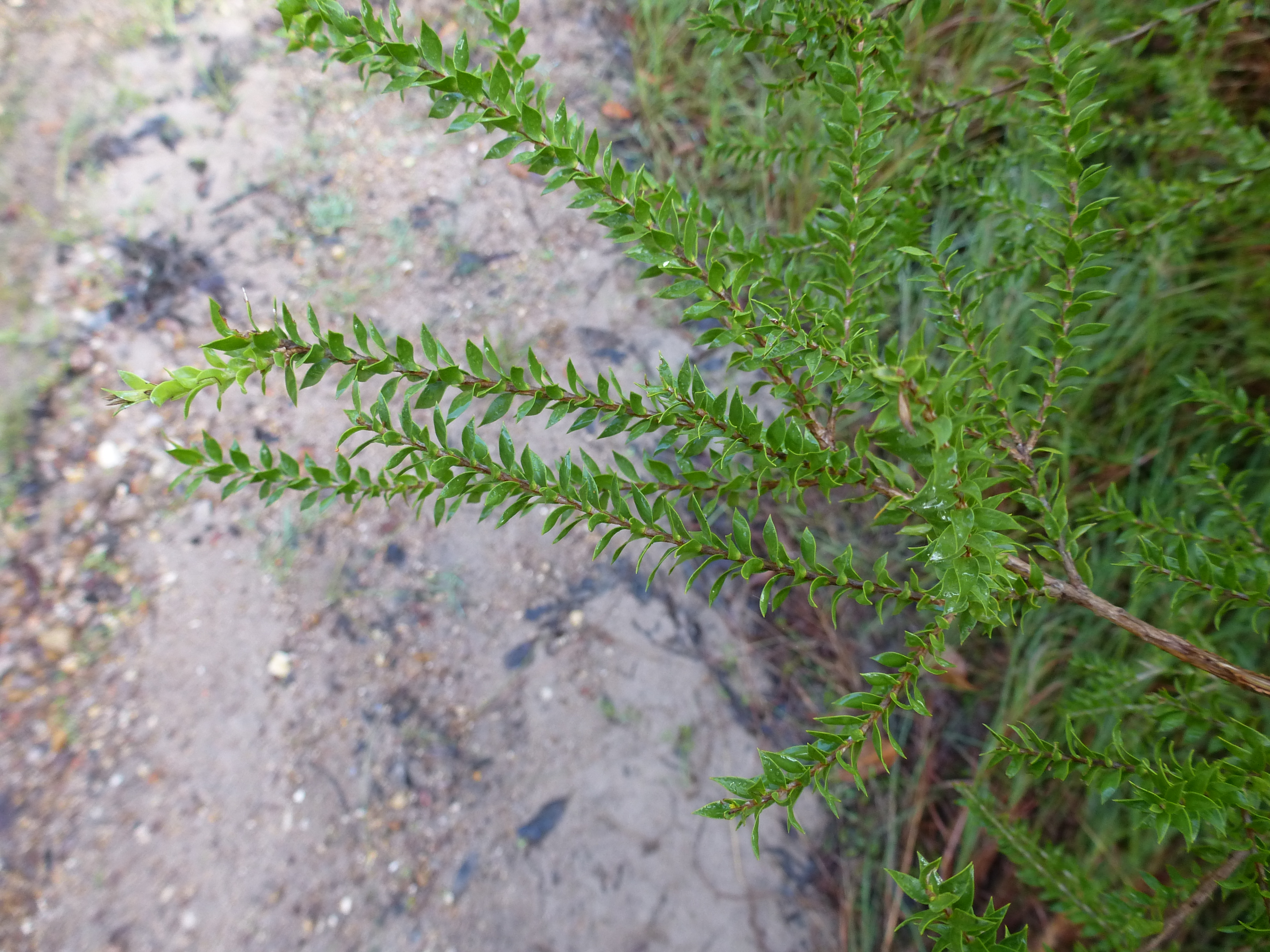
Foliage

== Distribution and habitat ==
This melaleuca is only known from an area of less than 1 km^{2} (0.4 mi^{2}) near Ravenshoe, where there are thought to be no more than 600 individual plants. It grows in forest, generally in poorly-drained or swampy soil on rhyolite rock near creeks. There seems to be a correlation between the size of the plants and the depth of the soil in which they grow.

== Ecology ==
=== Response to fire ===
After fire, M. lophocoracorum resprouts at the stem base and along stems from epicormic buds.
