= St Thomas More College, Sunnybank =

St Thomas More College

Location
- 272 Turton St; Sunnybank; Brisbane, Australia, Queensland, 4109; Australia

Information
- School type: Non-government, Co-educational secondary school
- Motto: God's Servant First
- Religious affiliation: Roman Catholic
- Opened: January, 1974
- Status: Open
- Principal: Leslie Conroy
- Teaching staff: 78
- Employees: 132
- Grades: 7–12
- Gender: Male, Female
- Enrolment: 1060
- Average class size: 27
- Student to teacher ratio: 13.4:1
- Houses: Assisi, MacKillop, Nagle, Romero, Turton
- Colours: Black, White, Gold
- Slogan: God's servant first
- Song: Servant's Song
- Sports: Rugby, Netball, Basketball, Volleyball, Esports, Futsal, Soccer, Oztag
- Publication: The College Weekly
- Website: STMC

St Thomas More College (STMC) is a Catholic coeducational secondary school in Sunnybank, Brisbane, Queensland, Australia. It is approximately 15 km south of the Brisbane CBD. It is a part of Brisbane Catholic Education.

== The chapel ==
Our Lady of Sacred Heart Catholic Church opened in Cooranga (then known as Cooranga North) on Sunday 11 September 1938 on land donated by Mrs Mary Gertrude O'Brien. It was at 152 Cooranga North Niagara Road (26.7566°S 151.4056°E). On 28 June 2017 in the middle of the night, the church building was relocated to St Thomas More College, where it is used as the school's chapel. The relocation required two trucks, one for the church body and another for the roof, and the journey was 380 kilometres (240 mi).
