= Diamondy, Queensland =

Diamondy
- Suburb
- Interactive map of Diamondy
- Coordinates: 26.6327°S 151.2841°E
- Country: Australia
- State: Queensland
- LGA: Western Downs Region
- Location: 31.3 km (19.4 mi) ENE of Jandowae; 63.5 km (39.5 mi) WSW of Kingaroy; 70.8 km (44.0 mi) NNE of Dalby; 138 km (86 mi) NNW of Toowoomba; 256 km (159 mi) WNW of Brisbane

Government
  - State electorate: Callide
  - Federal division: Maranoa

Area
  - Total: 352.1 km^{2} (135.9 sq mi)

Population
  - Total: 72 (2021 census)
  - Density: 0.2045/km^{2} (0.530/sq mi)
- Time zone: UTC+10:00 (AEST)
- Postcode: 4410
Suburbs around Diamondy
Darr Creek	Chahpingah	Ironpot
Jinghi	Diamondy	Ironpot
Jandowae	Cooranga	Boyneside

Diamondy is a rural locality in the Western Downs Region, Queensland, Australia. In the 2021 census, Diamondy had a population of 72 people.

== Geography ==
The locality is bounded to the east by the ridge of the Craig Range, part of the Great Dividing Range.

Glenmorriston is a neighbourhood in the south-west of the locality (26.6666°S 151.25°E).

Norjinghi is a neighbourhood in the south-west of the locality (26.6666°S 151.2333°E).

The Diamondy State Forest is in the north-east of the locality, extending into neighbouring Darr Creek, Chahpingah and Ironpot. Apart from this, the land use is a mix of crops and grazing on native vegetation.

== Demographics ==
In the 2016 census, Diamondy had a population of 47 people.

In the 2021 census, Diamondy had a population of 72 people.

== Education ==
There are no schools in Diamondy. The nearest government primary school is Jandowae State School in neighbouring Jandowae to the south-west. The nearest government secondary schools are Jandowae State School (to Year 10) in Jandowae, Kingaroy State High School (to Year 12) in Kingaroy to the north-east, and Dalby State High School in Dalby to the south.
