= Boyneside, Queensland =

Boyneside
- Suburb
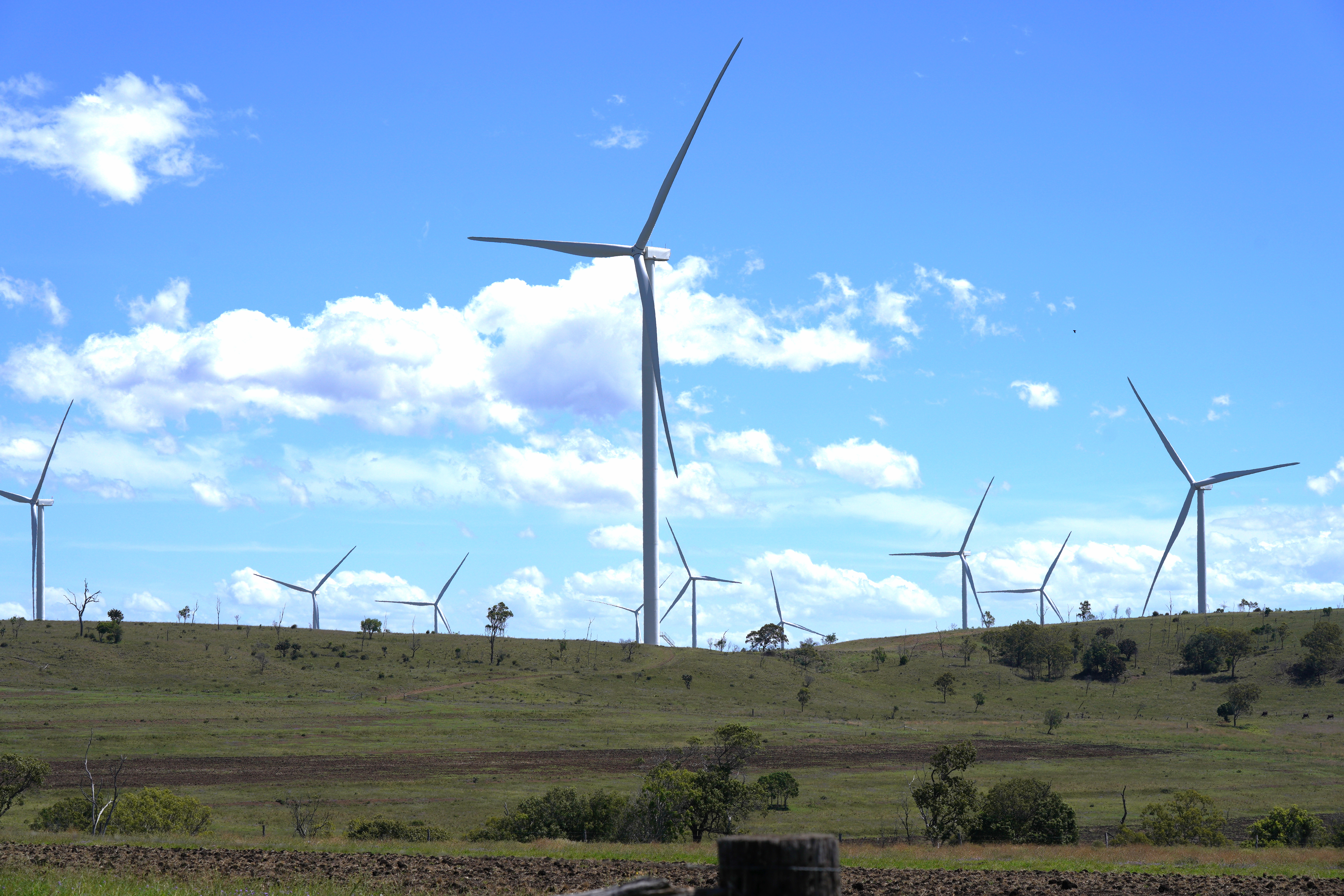
- Coopers Gap Wind Farm

- Interactive map of Boyneside
- Coordinates: 26.7080°S 151.5080°E
- Country: Australia
- State: Queensland
- LGA: South Burnett Region
- Location: 38.8 km (24.1 mi) NNE of Bell; 41.6 km (25.8 mi) SW of Kingaroy; 78.4 km (48.7 mi) NE of Dalby; 147 km (91 mi) NNW of Toowoomba; 240 km (150 mi) NW of Brisbane

Government
  - State electorate: Nanango
  - Federal division: Maranoa

Area
  - Total: 146.2 km^{2} (56.4 sq mi)

Population
  - Total: 67 (2021 census)
  - Density: 0.458/km^{2} (1.187/sq mi)
- Time zone: UTC+10:00 (AEST)
- Postcode: 4610
Suburbs around Boyneside
Ironpot	Ironpot	Mannuem
Diamondy	Boyneside	Kumbia
Cooranga	Bunya Mountains	Alice Creek

Boyneside is a rural locality in the South Burnett Region, Queensland, Australia. In the 2021 census, Boyneside had a population of 67 people.

== Geography ==
The Bunya Highway enters the locality from the south (Cooranga) and exits to the east (Mannuem / Kumbia).

== History ==
Boyneside Provisional School opened in 1927. It became Boyneside State School in 1929. It closed in 1969. It was on the north-western side of a bend in the Bunya Highway near its junction with Nords Road (approx 26.72538°S 151.53306°E).

== Demographics ==
In the 2016 census, Boyneside had a population of 58 people.

In the 2021 census, Boyneside had a population of 67 people.

== Education ==
There are no schools in Boyneside. The nearest government primary school is Kumbia State School in neighbouring Kumbia to the east. The nearest government secondary schools are Bell State School (to Year 10) in Bell to the south and Kingaroy State High School (to Year 12) in Kingaroy to the north-west.

== Economy ==
Coopers Gap Wind Farm is on Niagara Road (26.743°S 151.45°E).
