= Timothy Tovell =

Timothy William Tovell (1878 – August 1966) was an Australian airman in World War I who, with the help of his brother Edward 'Ed' Tovell, smuggled a young French orphan out of France and to Australia.

Tovell was born in England and was apprenticed to a builder in 1898. He then became a cabinet maker and did much work for the London gentry. He was married in 1911 to Gertrude, and they then emigrated to Australia to help him recover from a 'bad chest'. The couple moved to Jandowae near Dalby in Queensland. In 1916 both Tim and his brother Ed enlisted in the Australian Flying Corps. They were posted to Belgium, and after the war to Bickendorf, Germany as part of the occupying force.

== Henri Hermene — the French orphan ==
On Christmas Day 1918, a small orphan came begging for food from the Australians at Bickendorf. The orphan, whose name was probably Honore Hermene (later known as Henri Hermene and other variations), took a liking to Tim, and Tim took a liking to Henri. The orphan knew neither his age nor where he came from, other than his father was killed in the first week of the war and his mother shortly after when the Germans shelled his house, leading to the death of his mother and sister. The boy was rescued by an officer of the British artillery who looked after Henri until the officer too was killed, and Henri wounded.

Henri was treated in a military hospital and eventually discharged where he found his way back to the front lines and again attached himself to a British unit. This unit eventually ended up at Bickendorf, and Henri met the Tovell brothers. The Australian doctor who saw Henri estimated his age at nine. The Australian squadron adopted Henri as their 'mascot', and fed and clothed him. He was given a uniform and made an acting corporal. He was known by the airmen as "Little Digger".

In 1919, Tim Tovell discovered that his own son, Timmy, had died from influenza in Australia, and he decided to 'adopt' Henri and take him back to Dalby.

Tim, with the assistance of his brother, smuggled Henri out of France to England (in an oat sack) and then from England to Australia. The smuggling required considerable foresight and help from both Australian officers and men. To land Henri in Australia required permits, and Queensland premier Tom Ryan, who was travelling back to Australia on the same troop ship, heard about the effort that the airmen and Tovell brothers had gone to get him on board the ship, and arranged landing papers for Henri. The Australian press got hold of the story of the French orphan boy, and on landing Henri was mobbed by well-wishers and the curious. One woman offered Tim Tovell £1,500 to let her look after Henri, as she had lost her son in the war. The Tovell brothers declined the offer, and took Henri to Dalby, where he went to school.

Henri attempted to become an Australian citizen, but the French Embassy would not support him doing so until he was 21, and as he could not prove his age, he had great difficulty in enlisting in the Australian Air Force as he had wished. In 1928, Henri was killed in a motorcycle accident in Melbourne.

== After Henri ==
After being demobbed (discharged from the military) in 1919, Tim became a builder and lived in Brisbane until his death in 1966 at the age of eighty-eight. He was survived by his three children – Nancy, Edith and Edward – as well as his wife Gertrude (who died at age 94).
