= Wylarah =

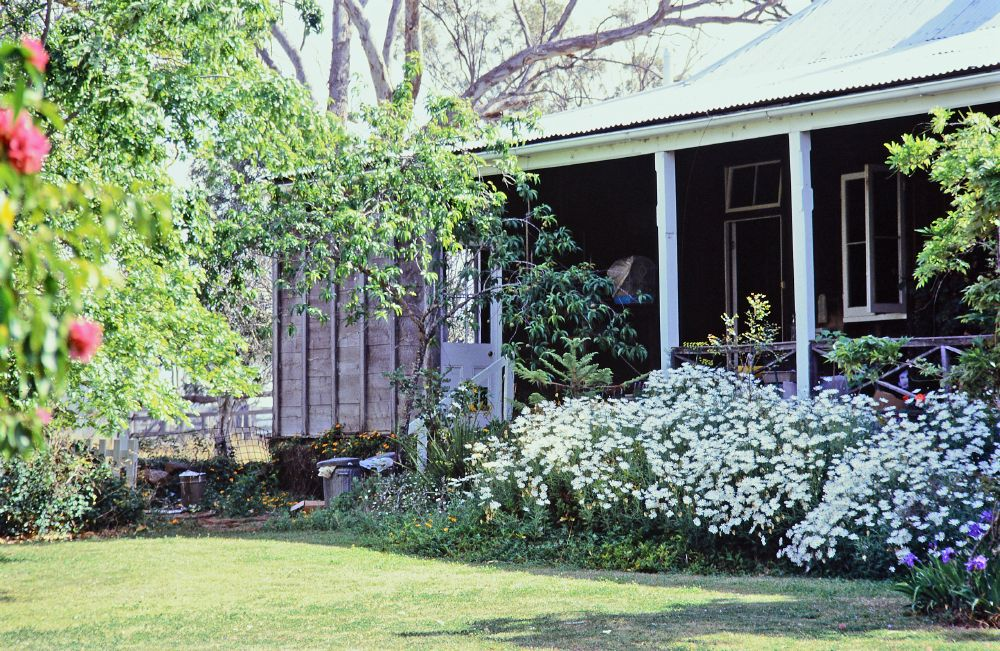
- Wylarah, 1992

- Location within Queensland Location within Australia
- 26.6343°S 151.456°E
- Location: South Burrandowan Road, Ironpot, South Burnett Region, Queensland, Australia

History
- Design period: 1870s–1890s (late 19th century)
- Built: 1891

Queensland Heritage Register
- Official name: Wylarah
- Type: state heritage (built)
- Designated: 21 August 1992
- Reference no.: 600646
- Significant period: 1891
- Significant components: residential accommodation – main house, out building/s, garden/grounds
- Builders: J Gibbs

Wylarah is a heritage-listed homestead at South Burrandowan Road, Ironpot, South Burnett Region, Queensland, Australia. It was built in 1891 by J Gibbs. It was added to the Queensland Heritage Register on 21 August 1992.

== History ==
Wylarah was selected in 1890 by Alfred Greenup who was manager of "Maryland" near Stanthorpe from 1868. He named the property after the Aboriginal word for black cockatoo. It comprised a grazing lease of 9,000 acres (3,600 ha) and an agricultural farm of 1,267 acres (506 ha) which were part of the resumption of Burrandowan Station.

In 1891 work on the main homestead commenced by J Gibbs, a Victorian, with assistance from Greenup. A slab hut was erected for use while the homestead was built. The hut's hearth survives. The bricks were made from clay on the property while the timber was milled at Chinchilla. Some of the furniture was also built by Gibbs at this time.

Originally planned to be U-shaped, the internal courtyard was considered too small, and so was covered and floored to form a central hall. An innovative feature was the integration of the kitchen into the house.

Although they visited the property in 1891, it was 1897 before the Greenup family moved to Wylarah. Alfred Greenup continued as manager of "Maryland" until 1905. Wylarah's hall was the venue for the district's church services and other community activities for many years.

After Greenup's death in 1915 the property was run by his son Harold. The lease area was halved in 1924. Following Harold Greenup's death in 1957 Wylarah was left to his daughter Frances, whose son now runs the property. He has undertaken considerable repairs including replacing the side verandah's floor and lining the service rooms at the rear.

== Description ==
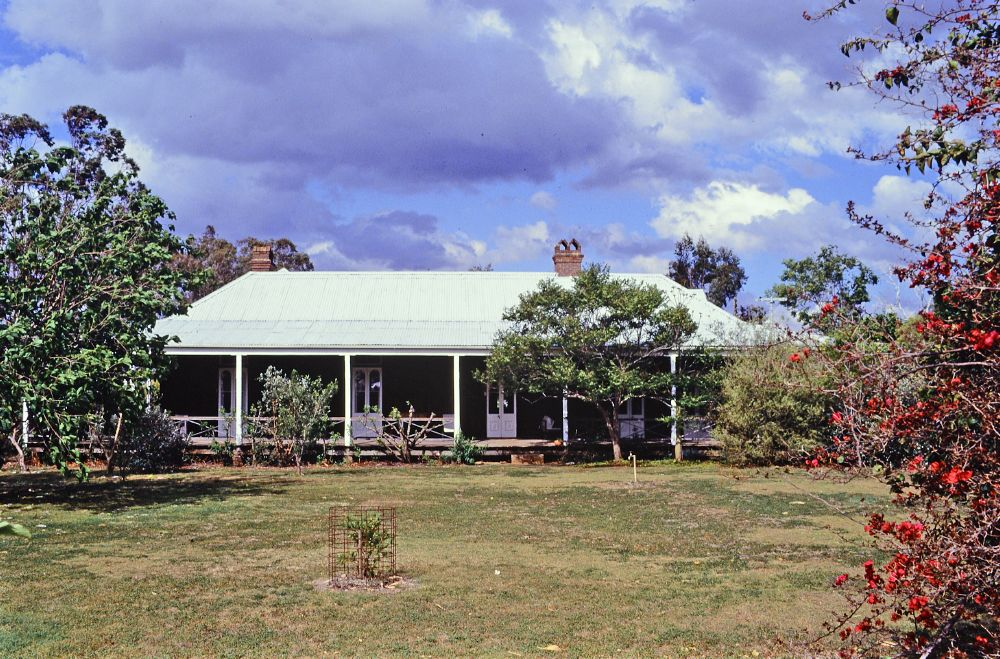
Wylarah, 1992

Wylarah is a pastoral property located approximately 50 kilometres (31 mi) west of Kingaroy.

The homestead is a single-storeyed, single-skinned timber building with a corrugated galvanised iron roof. The plan is unusual. It has a verandah on three sides, and a U-shaped hipped roof, encircling a double pitch over the central hall.

The central hall is encircled by bedrooms to the east and west, a large lounge to the north, a dining room to the north east, kitchen to the south east and several smaller service rooms to the south, the latter including the southern entry vestibule. The more formal entrance to the house is located on the northern frontage, which also features a metal belfry and weathercock flanked by two red brick chimneys.

An unpainted panel system is used throughout the interior as well as the exterior; it consists of an ironbark frame which is expressed, internally and externally, with vertically jointed (probably cypress) infill panels trimmed with cavetto-section pine mouldings.

The central hall, which measures approximately 15 by 11 metres (49 by 36 ft), has a polished beech floor, and a double-pitched, timber-lined ceiling with exposed rafters. A valley beam running north–south has two intermediate chamfer post supports, and two timber ties run east–west. The southern gable ends are glazed with yellow patterned glass. Similarly patterned glass is used in the fanlights above doors opening onto the central hall. The doors have clear glazed panels.

The rooms surrounding the central hall to the north, west and east have timber-lined ceilings, and French doors with arched upper panels opening onto the verandah and fanlights. Brick fireplaces with timber mantelpieces serve six of these rooms. The verandah has chamfered timber posts with cross-braced timber balustrades, and a timber-lined ceiling with exposed rafters.

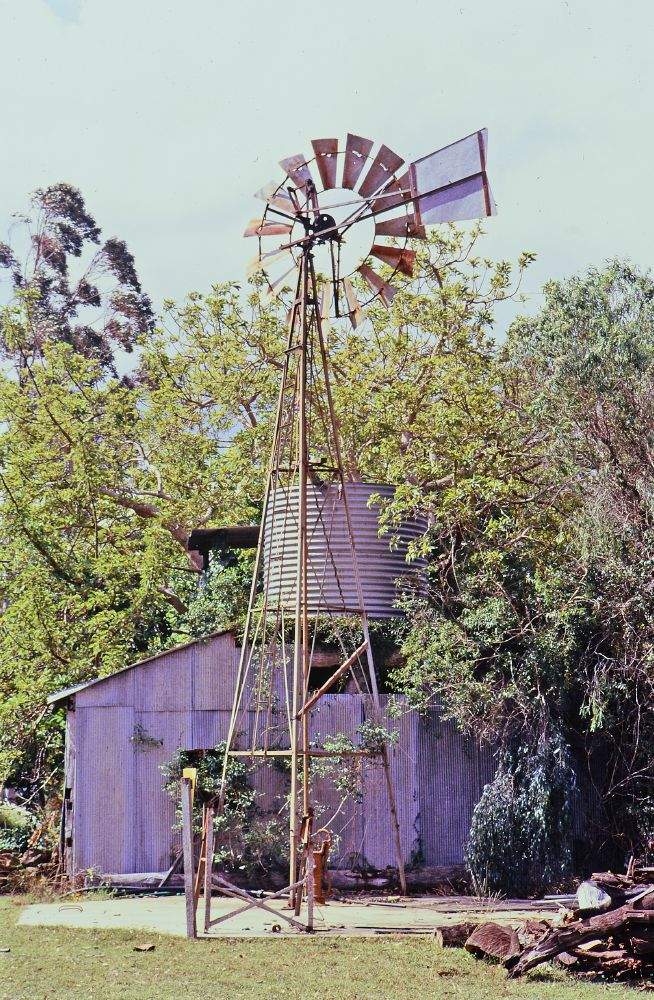
Wylarah Bathhouse and windmill, 1992

The grounds include lawns and gardens to the east and north, and remnants of the original orchard to the west. To the south of the homestead are several original service buildings: to the immediate south east is a corrugated iron bath house, with a corrugated iron water tank on its roof and a steel windmill immediately adjacent; a timber and corrugated iron blacksmith's shed sits further out to the south, and contains early blacksmithing and carpentry tools; to the west is a double-storeyed corrugated iron coach house, with the coachman's residence above and two coach bays; a timber hoist approximately 5 metres (16 ft) high sits between the coach house and the timber and corrugated iron stables.

Most of the original buildings survive, and Wylarah stills functions as a pastoral property.

== Heritage listing ==
Wylarah was listed on the Queensland Heritage Register on 21 August 1992 having satisfied the following criteria.

The place is important in demonstrating the evolution or pattern of Queensland's history.

Wylarah is significant in demonstrating rare aspects of Queensland's cultural heritage, namely: it is an uncommonly intact example of a late 19th century homestead complex which served a medium-sized pastoral property; and the homestead is unusual and idiosyncratic in its construction, plan form, distinctive central hall, unpainted interior and exterior, and varied use of timber. Wylarah demonstrates the principal characteristics of a 19th-century homestead complex on a pastoral property and its layout, unpainted materials, setting and harmonious colours of buildings and landscape exhibit aesthetic characteristics which are valued by the community.

The place demonstrates rare, uncommon or endangered aspects of Queensland's cultural heritage.

Wylarah is significant in demonstrating rare aspects of Queensland's cultural heritage, namely: it is an uncommonly intact example of a late 19th century homestead complex which served a medium-sized pastoral property; and the homestead is unusual and idiosyncratic in its construction, plan form, distinctive central hall, unpainted interior and exterior, and varied use of timber.

The place is important in demonstrating the principal characteristics of a particular class of cultural places.

Wylarah demonstrates the principal characteristics of a 19th-century homestead complex on a pastoral property.

The place is important because of its aesthetic significance.

The layout, unpainted materials, setting and harmonious colours of buildings and landscape of Wylarah exhibit aesthetic characteristics which are valued by the community.
