= Cooranga, Queensland =

Cooranga
- Suburb
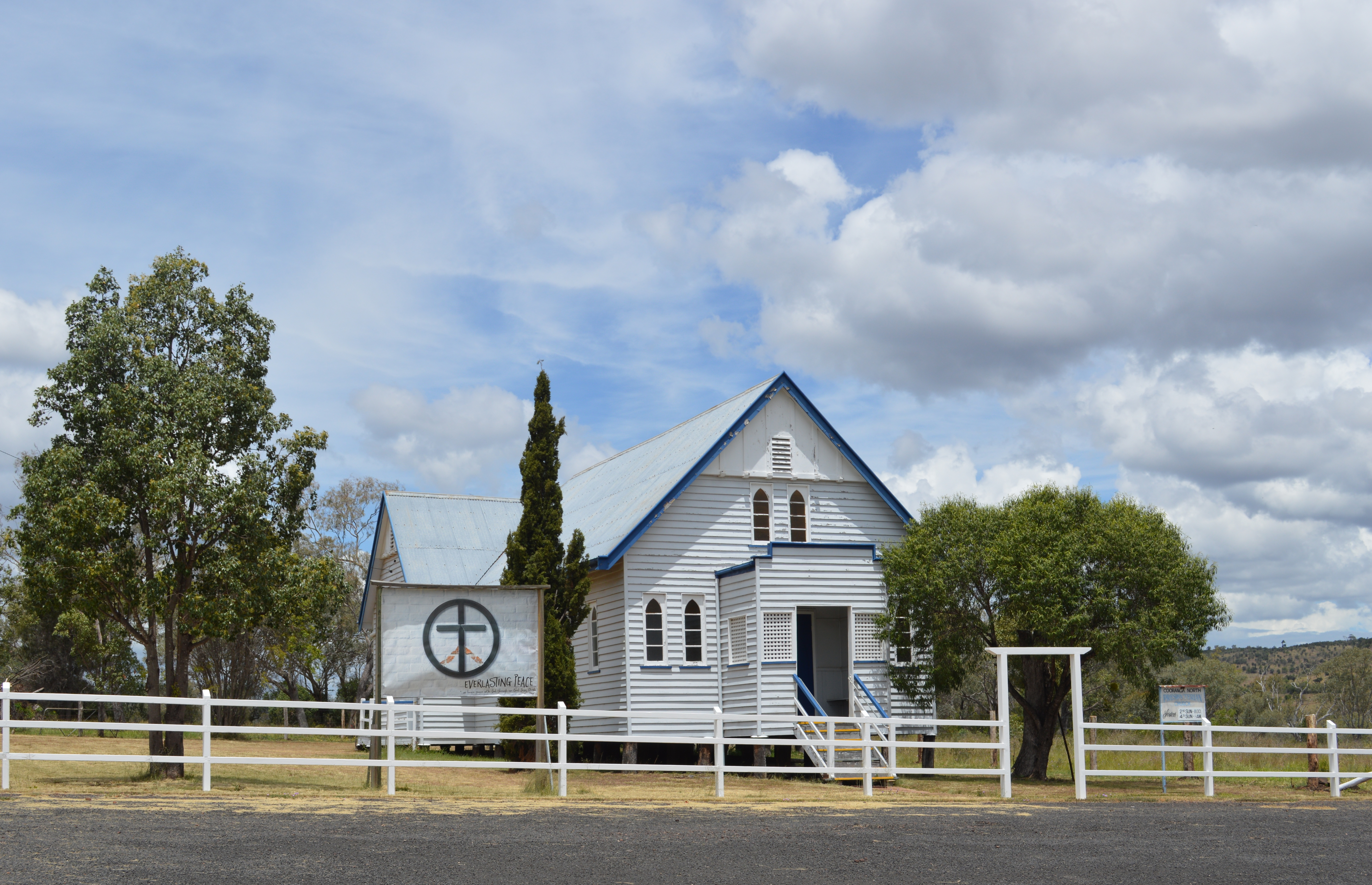
- Cooranga North Presbyterian Church, 2017

- Interactive map of Cooranga
- Coordinates: 26.8002°S 151.3219°E
- Country: Australia
- State: Queensland
- LGA: Western Downs Region
- Location: 53.8 km (33.4 mi) NNE of Dalby; 129 km (80 mi) NNW of Toowoomba; 256 km (159 mi) NW of Brisbane

Government
  - State electorate: Callide
  - Federal division: Maranoa

Area
  - Total: 360.4 km^{2} (139.2 sq mi)

Population
  - Total: 119 (2021 census)
  - Density: 0.3302/km^{2} (0.855/sq mi)
- Time zone: UTC+10:00 (AEST)
- Postcode: 4408
Suburbs around Cooranga
Jandowae	Diamondy	Boyneside
Jimbour West	Cooranga	Bunya Mountains
Jimbour East	Bell	Bunya Mountains

Cooranga is a rural locality in the Western Downs Region, Queensland, Australia. In the 2021 census, Cooranga had a population of 119 people.

== Geography ==
The Dalby–Jandowae Road runs along the western boundary.

== History ==
The locality was named and bounded on 14 September 2001, having been previously the neighbourhood of Cooranga North. The name Cooranga comes from a pastoral run name, which was probably taken from a creek name, reportedly a Kabi language word meaning war spear.

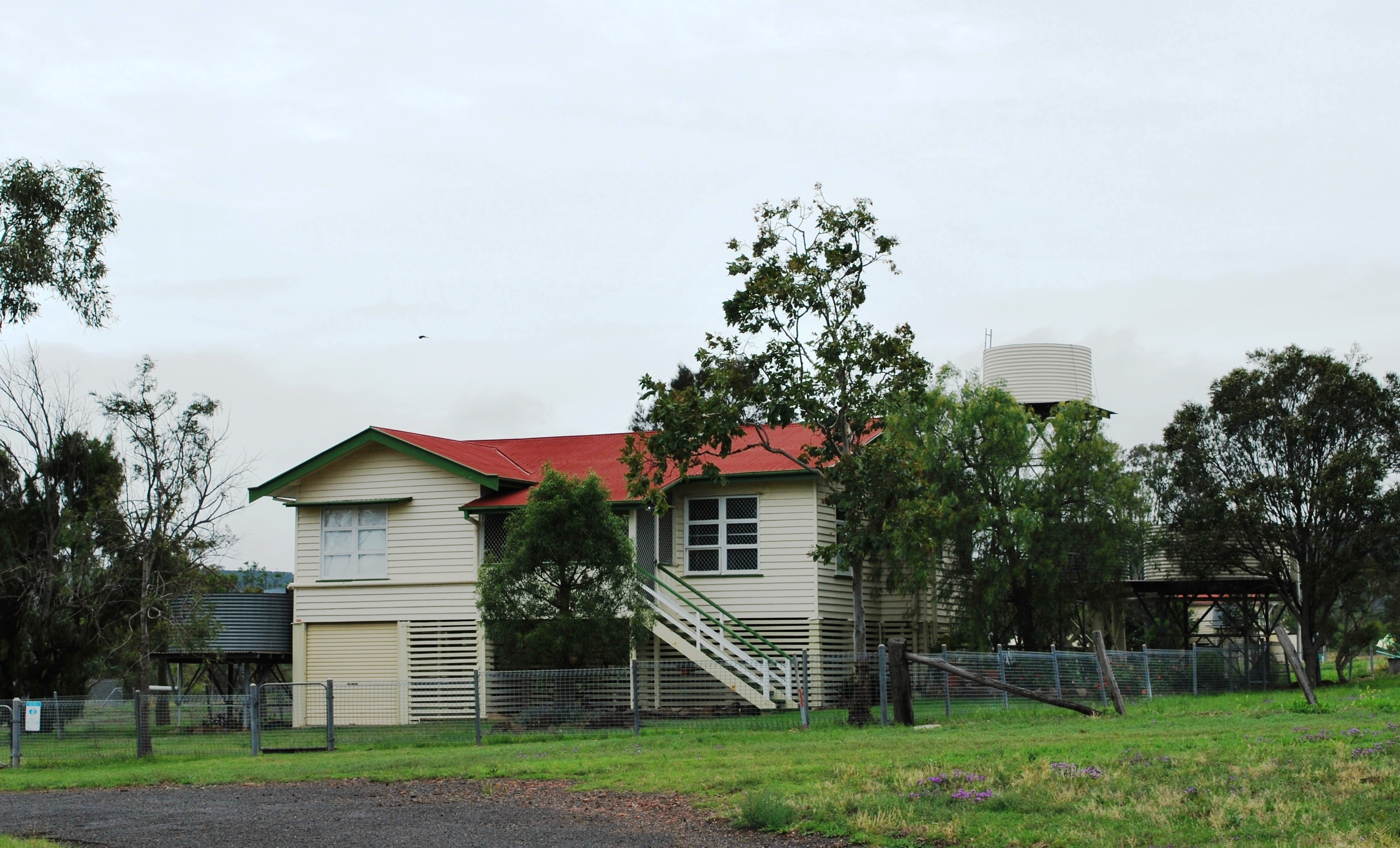
Cooranga North State School, 2008

An extension of the Bell Branch railway line from Bell to Mount Mahen through Cooranga North was proposed by government in 1915 but never built.

Cooranga North State School opened on 2 February 1914 and closed on 14 July 2003. It was at 14 Cooranga North Niagara Road (26.7681°S 151.4074°E).

A number of small schools operated in the immediate vicinity of Cooranga, each for a short period of time.

Mount Mahen Provisional School opened on 22 July 1925, closed briefly approximately February 1929, reopening 11 June 1929 and closed permanently on 11 February 1930. The building burned down in the 1930s. Children from the Hunter family formed most of the small enrolments recorded.

Booroonby State School, located approximately 6.5km from Cooranga towards Jimbour, operated from 1908 to c.1921.

Karaweena Provisional School, located between Jandowae and Cooranga, opened c.1921 and closed in 1926. It operated in the building from the closed Booroonby State School which was moved to the site by horse and dray, although the first lessons were conducted in the Martin family's garage and the Karaweena Hall before the permanent building was moved.

Newlands Provisional School, later known as Mahen Provisional School, opened near Cooranga on 4 June 1935 with furniture sent from Ducklo State School. The name was changed to Mahen Provisional School on 15 June 1937. Its status was upgraded from provisional in 1944, thus becoming known as Mahen State School. It closed on 30 June 1948.

Porters Gap State School opened on 22 May 1933 and closed on 31 December 1939.

Bunjinie State School, located nearby towards Jimbour East, operated from 16 May 1949 to 1958. It originally opened as Bunginie State School, with the minor spelling change happening during the first year.

The Karaweena district (at times referred to as Downfall Creek), not far from Cooranga, had a community hall and a cheese factory in place by 1925. The cheese factory was known as the Kurrajong Cheese Factory. A branch of the QCWA met in the local hall. In addition, the community had two sawmills operating, a cricket pitch and tennis courts.

Our Lady of Sacred Heart Catholic Church opened on Sunday 11 September 1938 on land donated by Mrs Mary Gertrude O'Brien. It was at 152 Cooranga North Niagara Road (26.7566°S 151.4056°E). On 28 June 2017 in the middle of the night, the church building was relocated to St Thomas More College in Sunnybank, Brisbane, where it is used as the school's chapel. The relocation required two trucks, one for the church body and another for the roof, and the journey was 380 kilometres (240 mi).

Cooranga North Presbyterian Church opened on Saturday 20 June 1953; however, Presbyterian services had been held in private homes and other local venues since 1914.

The Mahen hall was the first community hall in the district, opened in 1922 at the local Rifle Club range for an initial cost of £150, with several extensions and improvements made in the years which followed. The Dalby Herald reported in 1952 some details of the history of the Mahen hall, including "The first wedding in the Cooranga North district was celebrated in the hall on November 27, 1924, being that of Miss Gladys Hopper. Johnson’s showed their first pictures in Cooranga North in the hall on May 21, 1927, the programme including North of Moonbi*. On April 20, 1950, The trustees agreed to the transfer of the Mahen Rifle Club Hall to the committee" and, "... before a piano was procured for the Mahen Hall, Mr. McQuaker invented, and made, a dulcimer, and this was used for many years. *Note- the film title is probably a misprint, as Queensland's first feature length film, released in 1926, was a silent film called The Moth of Moonbi. The Mahen Hall was sold by auction on the day of the new Memorial Hall opening in late 1952, for £400 to Mr. Hugh O'Brien.

A community hall also existed at nearby Karaweena, with evidence of events recorded in historic newspapers from the 1920s to 1930s.

The Mahen Rifle Club commenced c.1916, boasting a significant membership base and participation in competitions across a wide area. A hall was built at their local rifle range c.1921 and opened in 1922, becoming known as the Mahen Hall, and hosted regular events included quarterly 'picnic' shoots and dances. The hall was deliberately constructed to serve the purposes of being a valued community asset, rather than just a storage shelter for the rifle club. It boasted a polished crows ash floor for dancing, a small stage and an adjoining supper area.

The first telephone services in the district were made available on Friday 18 August 1922 with the installation and opening of the Cooranga North telephone exchange, located within the home of Mr. N. Hopper, with his wife fulfilling management duties free of charge as a community service. The exchange already had a subscriber base of 23 at the time of the opening.

== Demographics ==
In the 2016 census, Cooranga had a population of 133 people.

In the 2021 census, Cooranga had a population of 119 people.

== Education ==
There are no schools in Cooranga. The nearest government primary schools are in Bell, Jandowae, and Jimbour. The nearest government secondary schools are in Bell and Jandowae but these provide schooling only to Year 10. For Years 11 and 12, the nearest government secondary school is Dalby State High School.

== Amenities ==
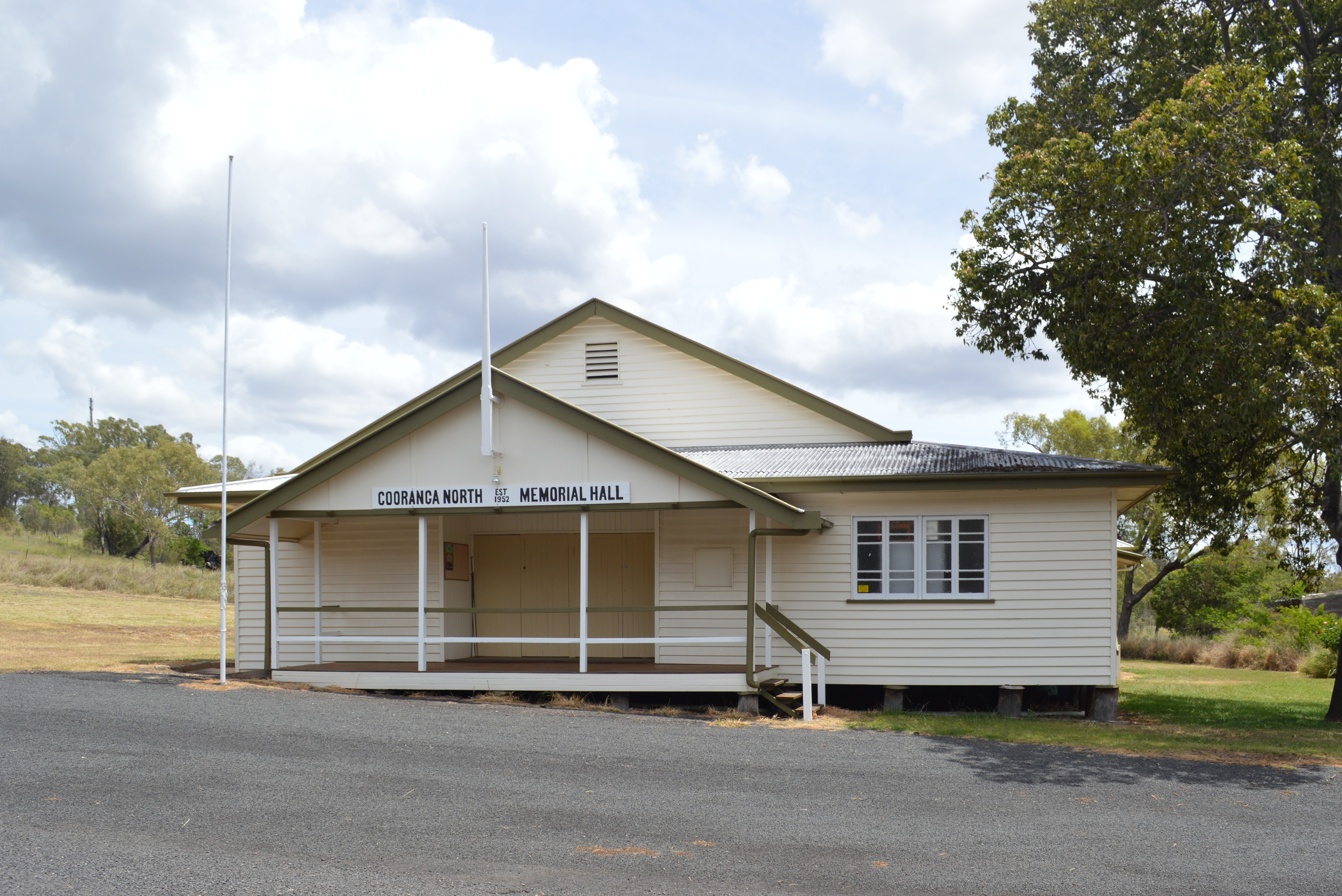
Cooranga North Memorial Hall, 2017

The Cooranga North branch of the Queensland Country Women's Association meets at the Cooranga North Memorial Hall at 41 Cooranga North Niagara Road (26.7663°S 151.4057°E).

Cooranga North Presbyterian Church is at 112 Cooranga North Niagara Road (26.7599°S 151.4072°E).

The Cooranga North Memorial Hall opened in late 1952, at a cost to the community of £4000, most of which had been raised prior and at the opening day festivities. It contains a memorial honour board listing men from the district who gave their lives in both world wars. This hall replaced the original hall in Cooranga, which was known as the Mahen Hall. It operated from 1922-1952.
