= Jandowae =

- Town
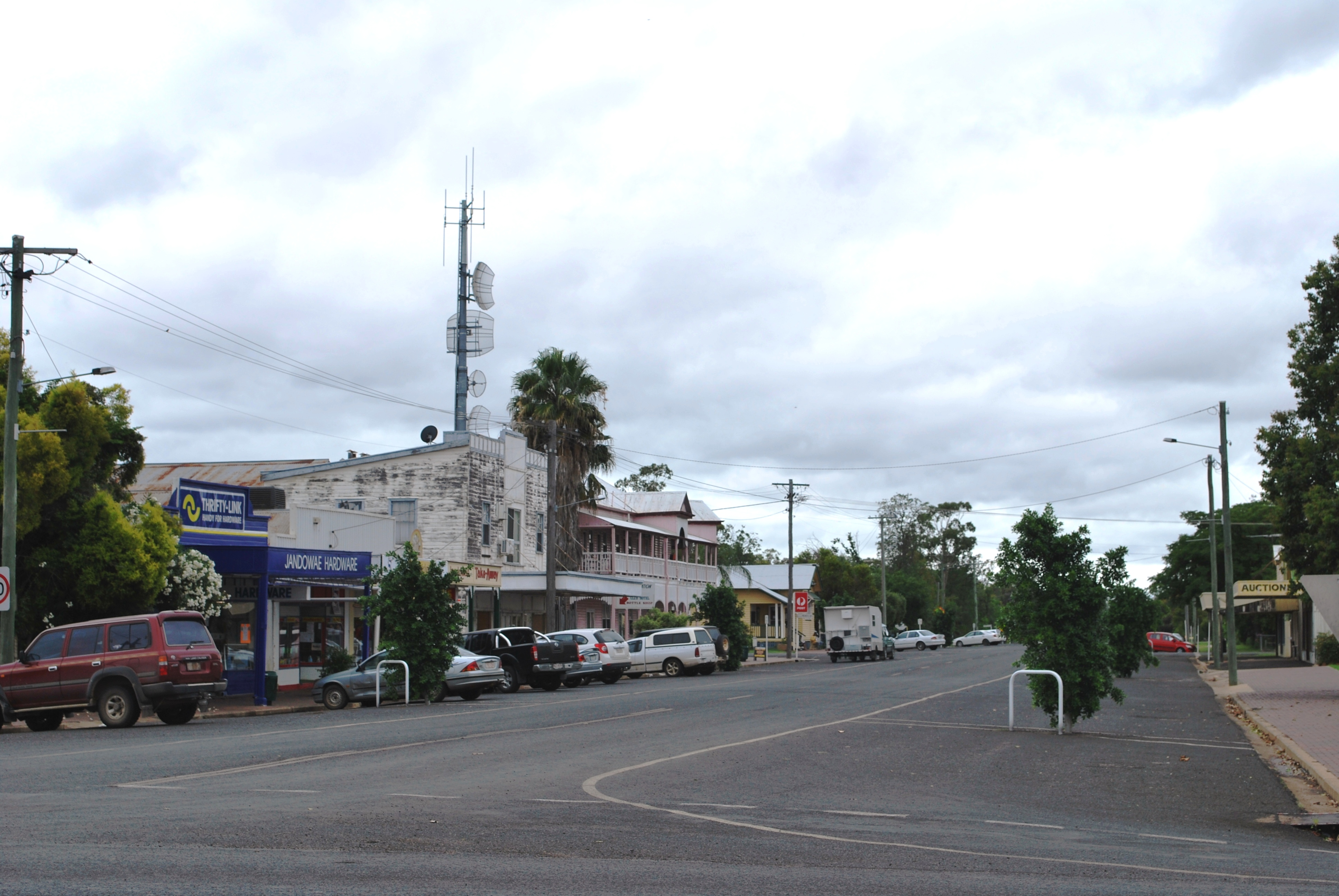
- The commercial centre of Jandowae

- Interactive map of Jandowae
- Coordinates: 26.7775°S 151.1108°E
- Country: Australia
- State: Queensland
- LGA: Western Downs Region
- Location: 51.3 km (31.9 mi) N of Dalby; 55.7 km (34.6 mi) E of Chinchilla, Queensland; 132 km (82 mi) NW of Toowoomba; 262 km (163 mi) WNW of Brisbane

Government
  - State electorate: Callide
  - Federal division: Maranoa

Area
  - Total: 254.1 km^{2} (98.1 sq mi)

Population
  - Total: 1,004 (2021 census)
  - Density: 3.9512/km^{2} (10.234/sq mi)
- Time zone: UTC+10:00 (AEST)
- Postcode: 4410
Localities around Jandowae
Jinghi	Diamondy	Diamondy
Tuckerang	Jandowae	Diamondy
Jimbour West	Cooranga	Cooranga

Jandowae /ˈdʒændəweɪ/ is a rural town and locality in the Western Downs Region, Queensland, Australia. In the 2021 census, the locality of Jandowae had a population of 1,004 people.

== Geography ==
The town is 259 kilometres (161 mi) west of the Brisbane. the capital of the state of Queensland. It sits within the Indigenous country of Barunggam, the traditional lands of the Barunggam people.

Bush Grove is a neighbourhood (26.7166°S 151.2666°E).

Jandowae railway station is an abandoned railway station (26.7828°S 151.1087°E) on the closed Jandowae railway line.

Dalby–Jandowae Road enters from the south, Kingaroy–Jandowae Road enters from the north-east, and Jandowae Connection Road exits to the north-west.

== History ==
Baranggum (also known as Barrunggam, Barunggam Parrungoom, Murrumgama) is an Australian Aboriginal language spoken by the Baranggum people. The Baranggum language region includes the landscape within the local government boundaries of the Western Downs Regional Council, particularly Dalby, Tara, Jandowae and west towards Chinchilla.

The first European settlers arrived in the area in the 1860s and the first documented European birth was Henry Bateman in 1866. The town was at first called Jindowie, from the local Aboriginal word for a waterhole. Later, a man called John or Jack Dowiae established a camp and rest area for travellers called the John Dowiae camp. This led to some early settlers using the name Jondowiae. With the coming of the railway in 1914, the name was changed again to Jandowae, to avoid confusion with nearby Jondaryan.

The fertile soil allowed the development of agriculture and combined with a flourishing timber industry saw the expansion of industry and commerce and the establishment of churches, halls and banks.

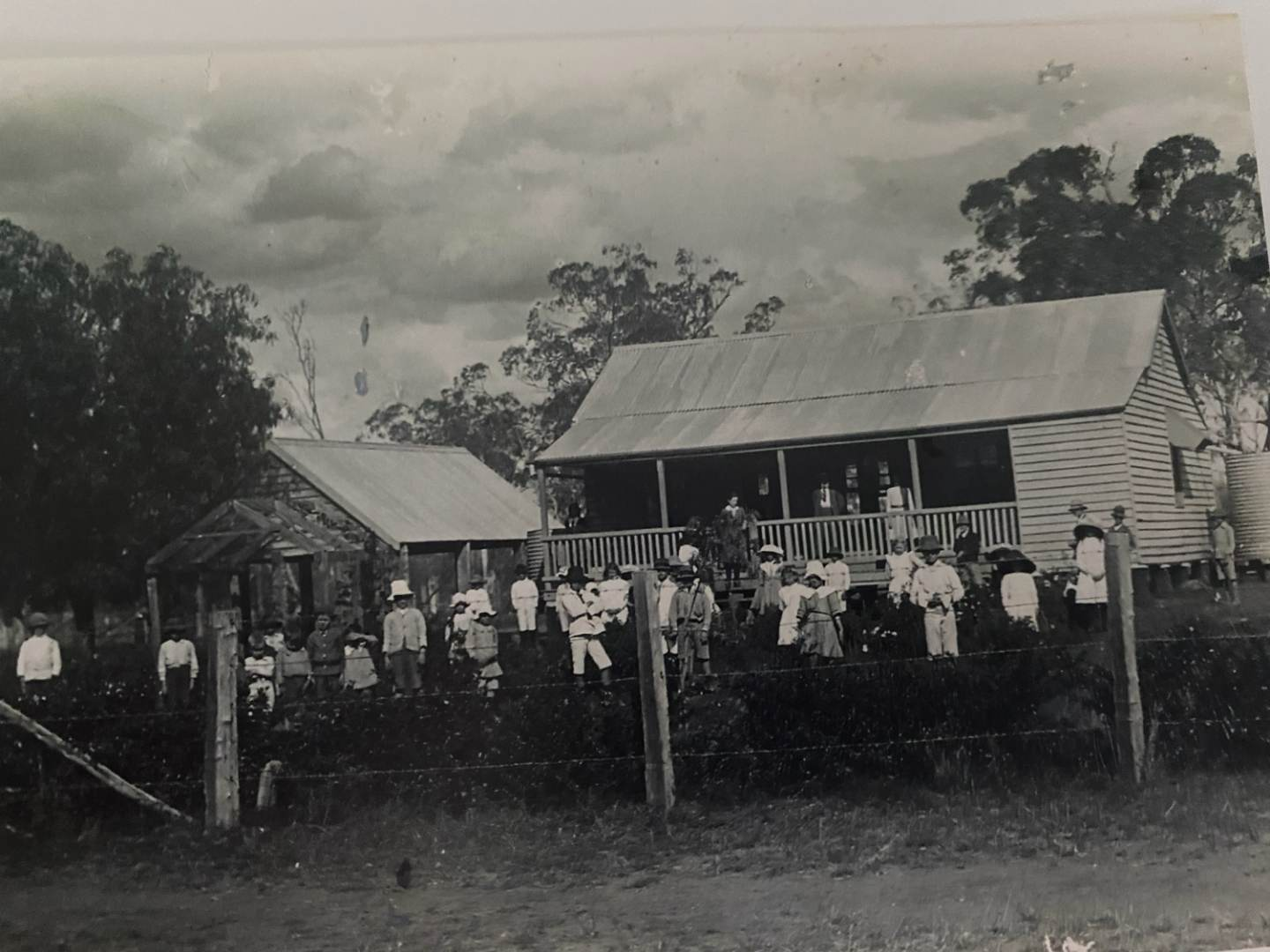
Jondowaie Provisional School, circa 1900

Jondowaie Provisional School opened on 28 March 1887 with thirteen students enrolled for the first year. It became Jondonwaie State School on 1 January 1909. In 1915, it was renamed Jandowae State School. In 1988 it was expanded with a secondary department (to Year 10 ).

Jondowae's first Post Office opened on 1 January 1890, and exists today as a private residence. The post office was renamed Jandowae in 1913.

The cemetery opened in 1900. There was an earlier cemetery in Market Street, two blocks from the Church of England, but nothing remains of the site and the Western Downs Regional Council believes it is under subsequent developments.

Jondowaie Creek Provisional School opened on 6 February 1902. In 1903 it was renamed Yee-am Provisional School. On 1 January 1909 it became Yee-Am State School. It closed in April 1921.

Jondowaie's Immaculate Conception Catholic Church at 49 Hickey Street was opened and dedicated on 25 April 1909 by Reverend Father Thomas Nolan. This church still exists but a new church was erected beside it in 1964.

At a town land sale in June 1909, blocks of land were purchased for an Anglican church and a Presbyterian Church. The Presbyterian block was sold in 1914 at a considerable profit in order to buy another site.

In 1914 land was purchased by the Methodists intending to build a church.

Wilga Downs Provisional School opened on 26 January 1916 as a half time school sharing a teacher with Currandale Provisional School. In 1922, the half time configuration was changed and Wilga Downs shared a teacher with Carlyle Provisional School (while Currandale shared with Glenmorriston). In 1923, Wilga Downs Provisional School was renamed Jandowae East Provisional School continuing to share a teacher with Carlyle until Carlyle closed in 1929. Jandowae East then became a full time provisional school and became Jandowae East State School in 1955. It closed in 1964. It was on the western corner of Jandowae East Road and Skinners Road (26.77836°S 151.20779°E).

St Paul's Anglican Church was opened on Sunday 19 March 1917 by Archdeacon Arthur Richard Rivers. On 17 September 1953 Archbishop Reginald Halse laid the foundation for the current church building. It was opened and dedicated in June 1957 in the presence of over 300 people. The new church cost of a total £14,000 including fittings and furnishings with some of the work being done by local volunteers.

The stump-capping ceremony for the Jandowae Presbyterian Church in George Street was held on Saturday 19 August 1922. The church was officially opened on Sunday 3 December 1922 by Reverend Alexander McIntyre Martin, Moderator of the Toowoomba Presbytery. The wooden church was 41 by 22 feet (12.5 by 6.7 m). It held 150 people at the opening with others standing outside.

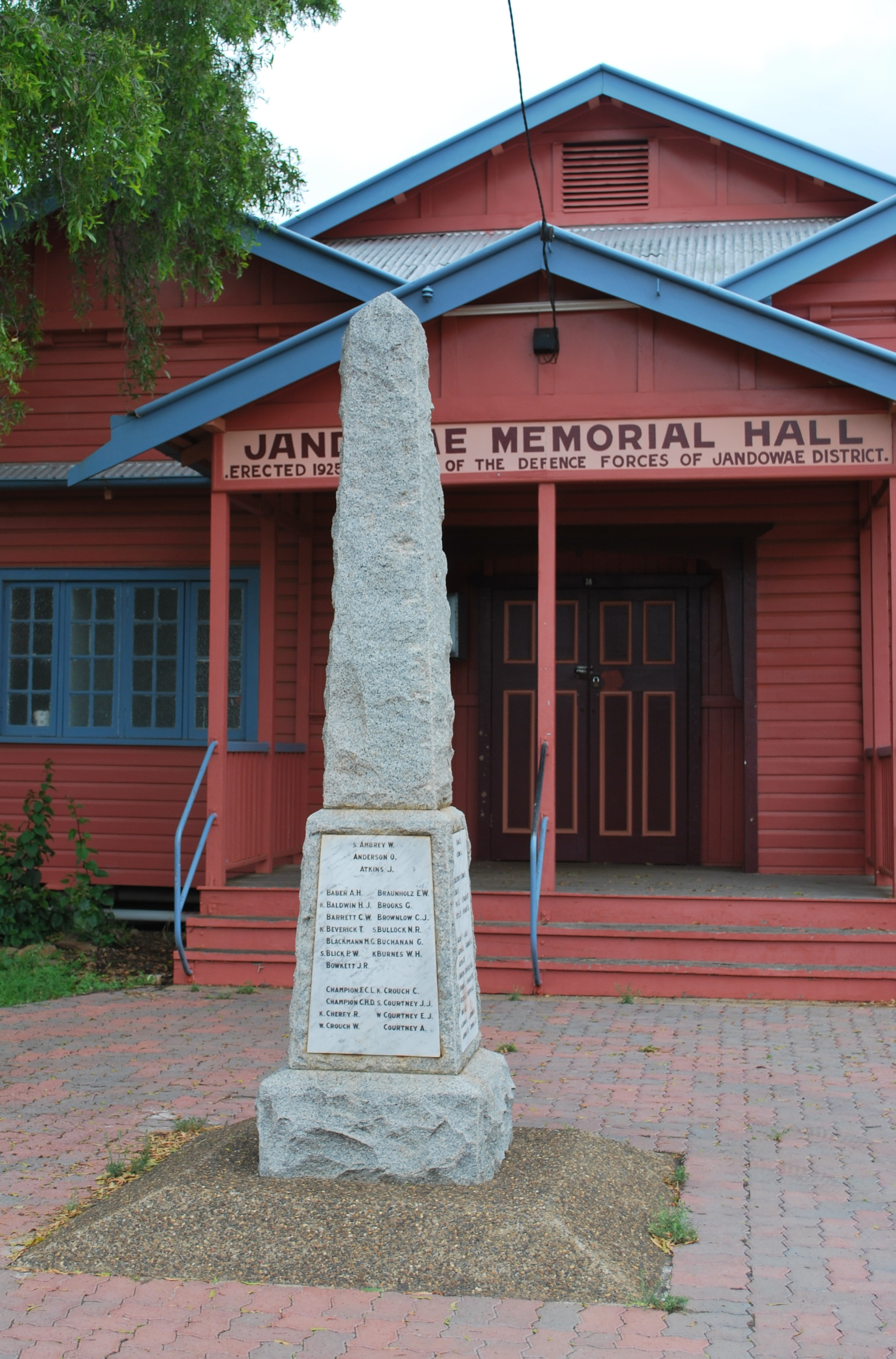
Jandowae War Memorial, 2008

The Jandowae war memorial was unveiled by Victor Drury and the Member of the Queensland Legislative Assembly for Dalby, Walter Sparkes, on 25 April 1935.

On Saturday 12 March 1949 there was a stump-capping cemetery for a Methodist church. Prior to this Methodist services had been held in the Presbyterian church. On Saturday 24 September 1949 the church was officially opened.

In 1964 a Lutheran church was opened at 43 Sydney Street, the church building having been relocated from Meringandan where it had been the Methodist Church since it was built in about 1908. It was deconsecrated in 1999 and is now in private ownership.

Sewerage was provided for the town in 1974.

The current Jandowae Public Library opened in 2000 and had a minor refurbishment in 2014.

In 2001, in order to stem a decline in population and economic activity and encourage new residents and industry to Jandowae, Wambo Shire Council ran a "dollar block" promotion. The promotion involved the sale of 38 parcels of land, both residential and industrial, for one dollar each. The promotion made news throughout Australia and overseas including New Zealand, Hong Kong, England and the United States. The promotion proved popular with over 1,000 applications received. To maintain fairness, a ballot system was implemented along with a condition requiring the establishment of a house on the block within 12 months or the land would return to the ballot. As a result of the promotion, the decline in population was halted and new industry was attracted to town including a manufacturer of RFID cattle ear tag readers.

On 30 January 2024, the town of Jandowae was cut off by flood waters following 250 millimetres (9.8 in) of rain the previous night.

== Demographics ==
In the 2006 census, the locality of Jandowae had a population of 1,006 people.

In the 2011 census, the locality of Jandowae had a population of 1,246 people.

In the 2016 census, the locality of Jandowae had a population of 1,047 people.

In the 2021 census, the locality of Jandowae had a population of 1,004 people.

== Economy ==
Jandowae, which was the largest town in the Wambo Shire prior to its amalgamation, is surrounded by rich alluvial soil and is one of Queensland's largest wheat growing areas. The area also produces other crops such as barley, sorghum, oats, millet, panicum, sunflower, safflower and linseed. Beef and dairy cattle are raised in the area and Jandowae was home to two large sawmills.

There are a number of homesteads in the locality:

- Athlon (26.7587°S 151.1364°E)
- Balanor (26.7494°S 151.1408°E)
- Belgiddi (26.7351°S 151.2199°E)
- Bloomfield (26.7143°S 151.1692°E)
- Bonathorpe (26.7780°S 151.1996°E)
- Boobilarri (26.7586°S 151.2248°E)
- Brigalow Park (26.6526°S 151.1479°E)
- Carlyle (26.7454°S 151.2407°E)
- Coniston (26.6989°S 151.1335°E)
- Eversleigh (26.7203°S 151.2330°E)
- Fairymount (26.7356°S 151.1825°E)
- Glenfillan (26.7616°S 151.2189°E)
- Glenroy Farm (26.7678°S 151.2077°E)
- Hazeldean (26.7884°S 151.1573°E)
- Jerogael (26.7419°S 151.1572°E)
- Kahmoo (26.7634°S 151.0930°E)
- Kel-Andy (26.7499°S 151.1413°E)
- Kildurham (26.7968°S 151.1721°E)
- Lauriston (26.7709°S 151.2511°E)
- Lone Pine (26.7536°S 151.1434°E)
- Lornsdale (26.7398°S 151.0743°E)
- Milrae (26.7152°S 151.2038°E)
- Myrtle Grove (26.7174°S 151.0892°E)
- Oakfields (26.7284°S 151.0823°E)
- Oakland (26.7345°S 151.2552°E)
- Pine Haven (26.7446°S 151.1380°E)
- Rangeview (26.7424°S 151.1512°E)
- Samoa (26.7925°S 151.1955°E)
- Sunrisestar (26.7390°S 151.1633°E)
- The Pines (26.7068°S 151.1628°E)
- The Ranch (26.7271°S 151.1959°E)
- The Rockies (26.7036°S 151.2304°E)
- Wattle Grove (26.7833°S 151.1747°E)
- Wilga Downs (26.7837°S 151.2154°E)
- Wongaree (26.7830°S 151.2019°E)
- Woodburn (26.6859°S 151.1985°E)
- Woodsome (26.7435°S 151.2082°E)

There is an abattoir (26.7401°S 151.0909°E).

== Facilities ==
Jandowae Police Station is at 34 George Street (26.7807°S 151.1114°E).

Jandowae Fire Station is at 55 High Street (26.7818°S 151.1106°E).

Jandowae SES Facility is at 76 Myall Street (26.7811°S 151.1189°E).

Jandowae Ambulance Station is at 26 George Street (26.7811°S 151.1108°E).

Jandowae Hospital is a public hospital at 11 Dalby Street (26.7808°S 151.1047°E). It has a heliport (26.7814°S 151.1047°E).

Jandowae Cemetery is on Old Rosevale Road on the corner of Bindings Road (26.7780°S 151.1248°E).

The sewage treatment plant is on Sydney Street on the corner of Davisions Road (26.7751°S 151.0974°E).

Ergon Energy has an electrical sub-station at 45 Sydney Street (26.7841°S 151.1063°E).

Jandowae has a telephone exchange at 41 Hickey Street (26.7801°S 151.1110°E).

== Amenities ==
Amenities in the town include a post office, Queensland Government Agent and a bank.

There are three hotels in Jandowae known locally as the Top pub (Club Hotel), the Middle pub (The Exchange Hotel) and the Bottom pub (Jandowae Hotel), all providing meals and accommodation.

Sporting facilities include bowls, golf, tennis, swimming, squash and a new skate park facility.

The Western Downs Regional Council operates a public library in Jandowae at 22 George Street.

The Jinghi Valley branch of the Queensland Country Women's Association meets at the Jandowae Tennis Clubhouse on High Street.

St Paul's Anglican Church is at 33–35 Market Street (26.7790°S 151.1116°E).

The Immaculate Conception Catholic Church is at 49–53 Hickey Street (26.7819°S 151.1125°E).

Jandowae-Warra Uniting Church is at 11 George Street (26.7817°S 151.1090°E).

Jandowae Memorial Hall is at 38 George Street (26.7804°S 151.1119°E). It can be booked for community events.

== Education ==
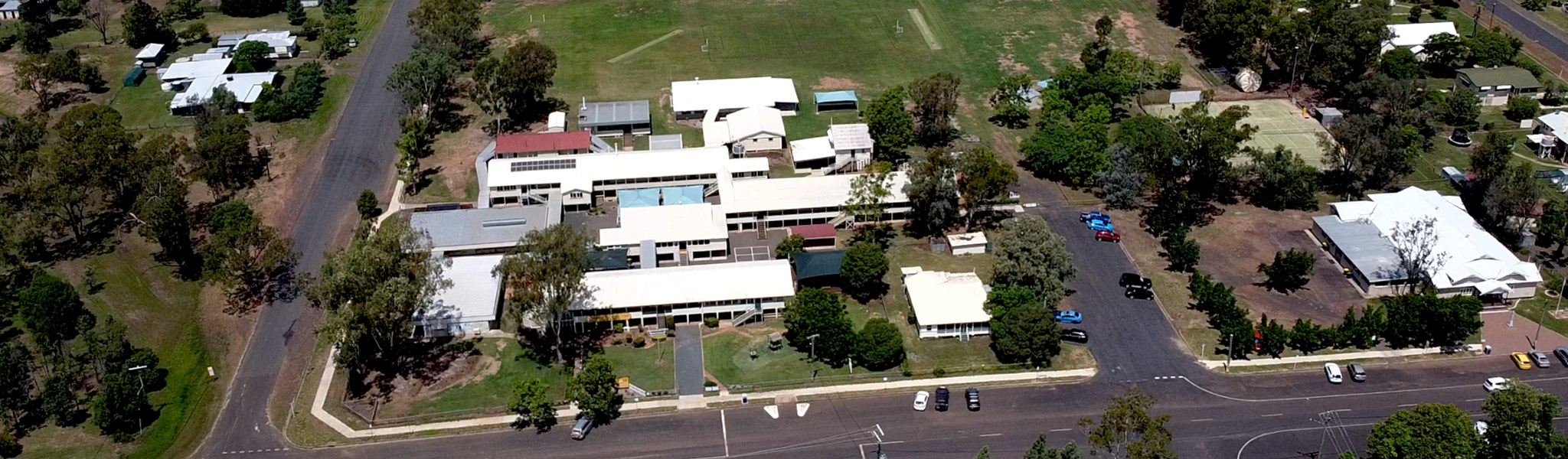
Jandowae State School, aerial view, 2025

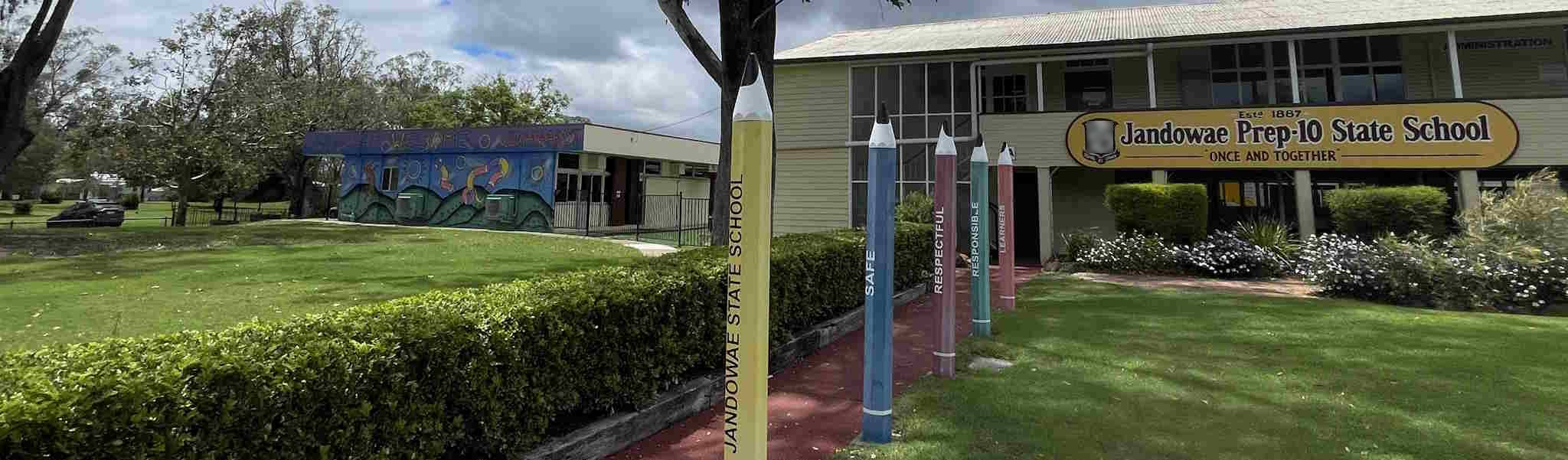
Jandowae State School, 2025

Jandowae State School is a government primary and secondary (Prep–10) school for boys and girls at 44 George Street (26.7797°S 151.1127°E). In 2016, the school had an enrolment of 123 students with 14 teachers (13 equivalent full-time) and 11 non-teaching staff (8 equivalent full-time). In 2018, the school had an enrolment of 152 students with 15 teachers (13 full-time equivalent) and 12 non-teaching staff (8 full-time equivalent).

For secondary education to Year 12, the nearest government schools are Dalby State High School in Dalby to the south and Chinchilla State High School in Chinchilla to the west.

== Events ==
The major festival in Jandowae is the Jandowae Timbertown festival. The festival, held biennially, recognises and celebrates the contribution that the timber industry has made to Jandowae and attracts 3,000 to 4,000 people to the town. Other events in the town include a senior pro-am golf tournament and the Jandowae Cup race meeting.

== Notable people ==
- Timothy Tovell, an Australian airman in World War I who smuggled a young French orphan out of France and to Australia.

== Gallery ==
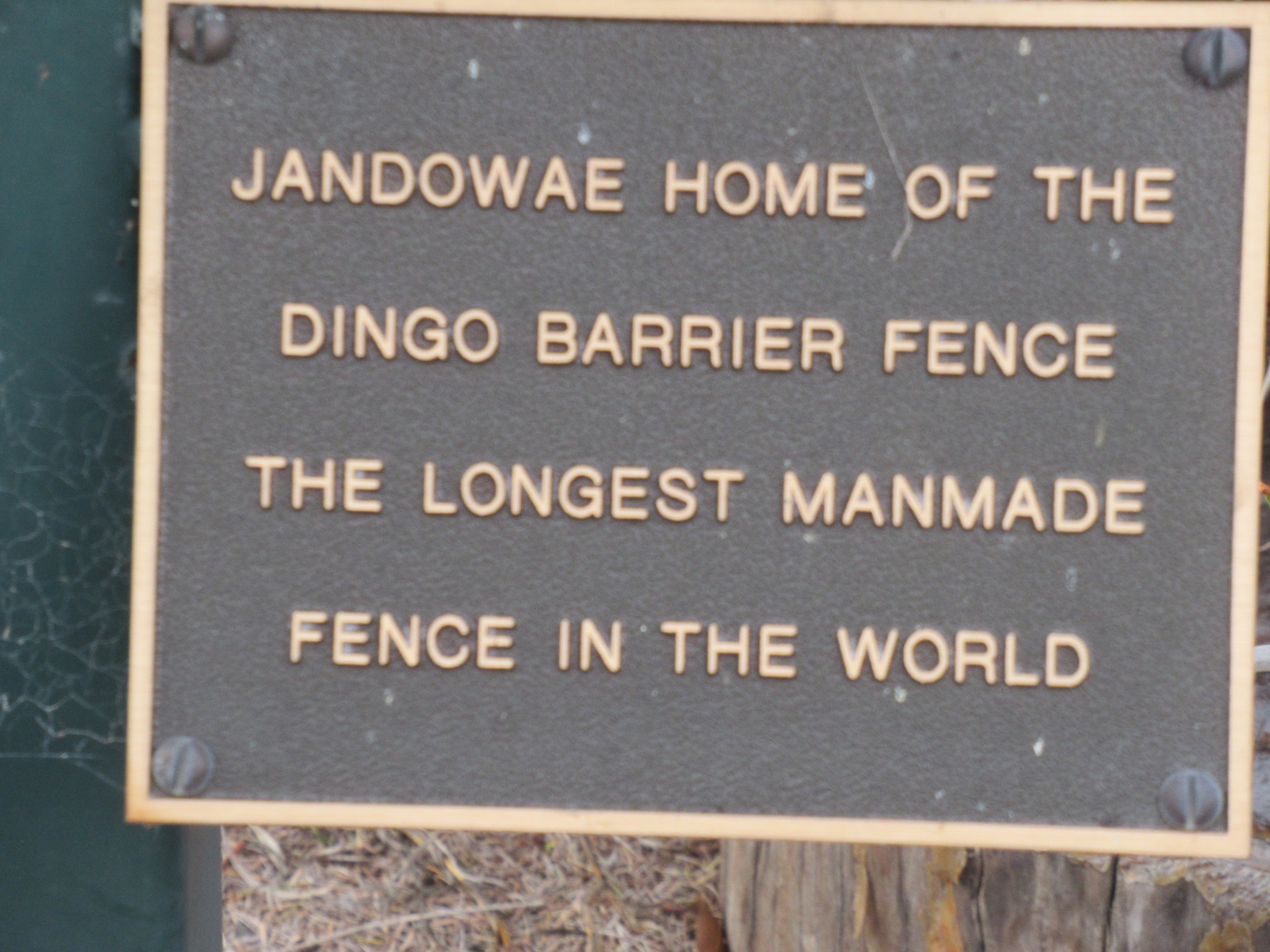
Dingo statue plaque, Jandowae, Queensland.

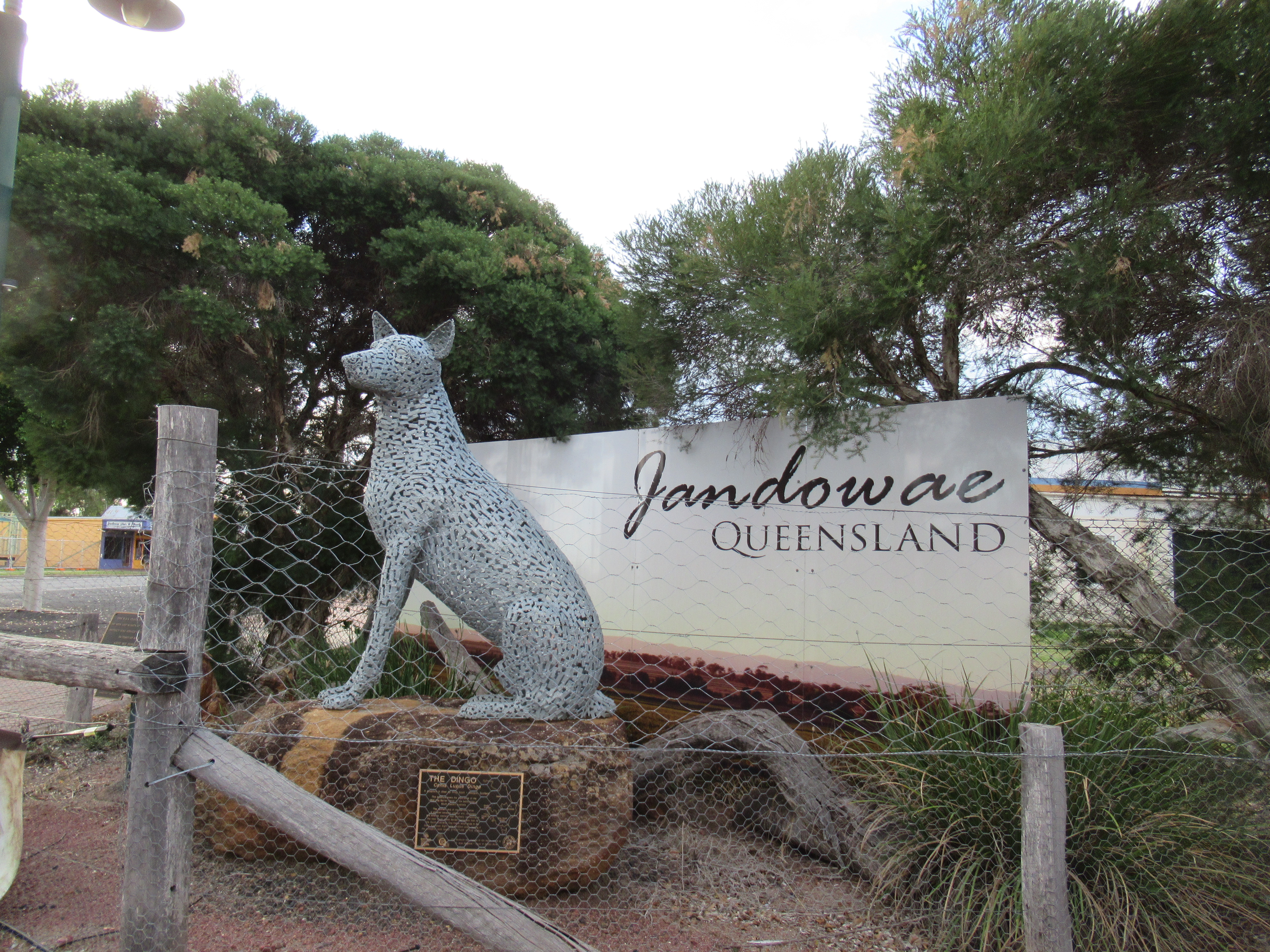
Dingo statue, Jandowae, Queensland, Australia. Jandowae is home of the Dingo Barrier fence, the longest man made fence in the world. Sculpture in steel by Andy Scott.

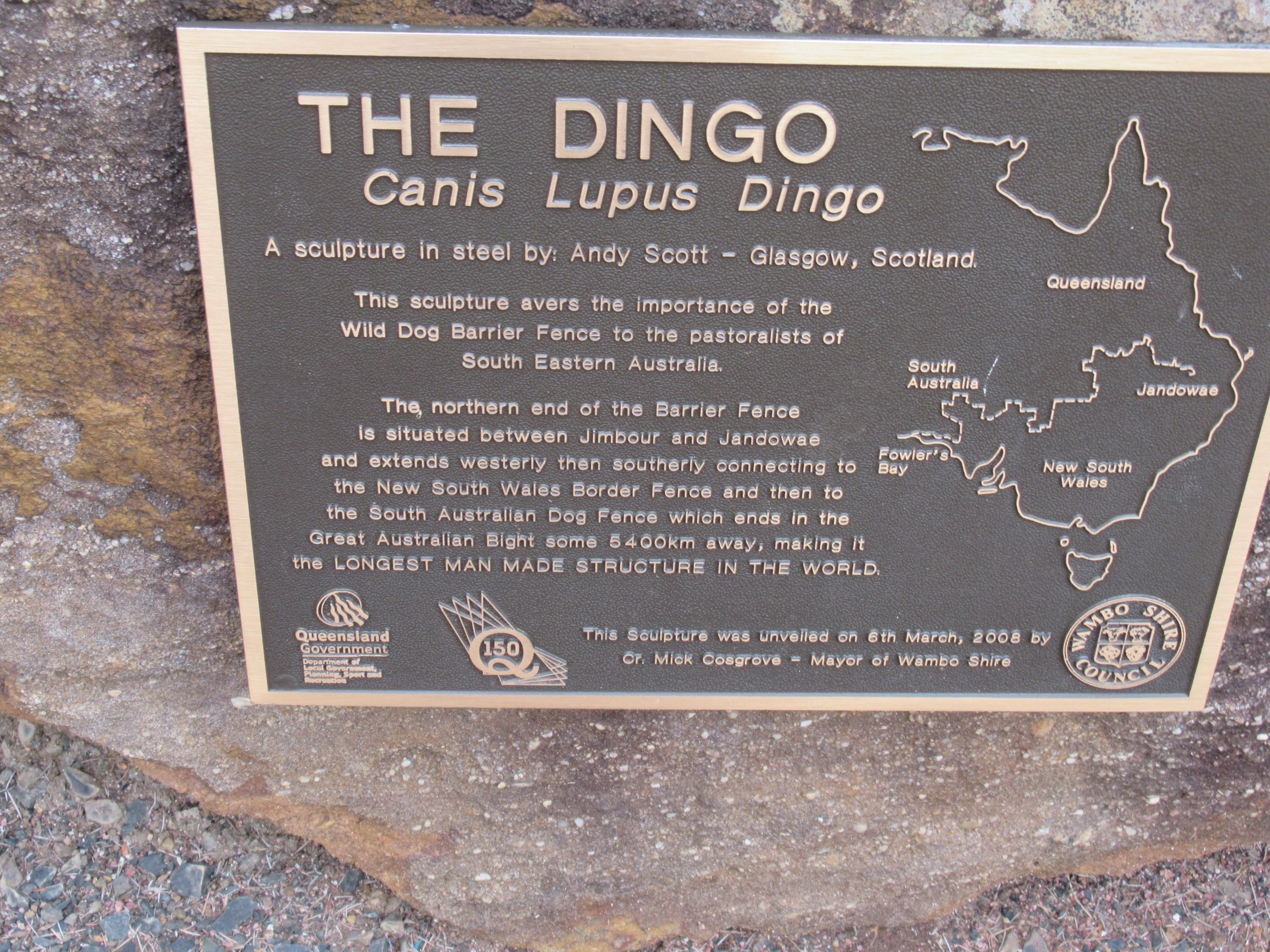
Dingo statue plaque, Jandowae, Queensland.

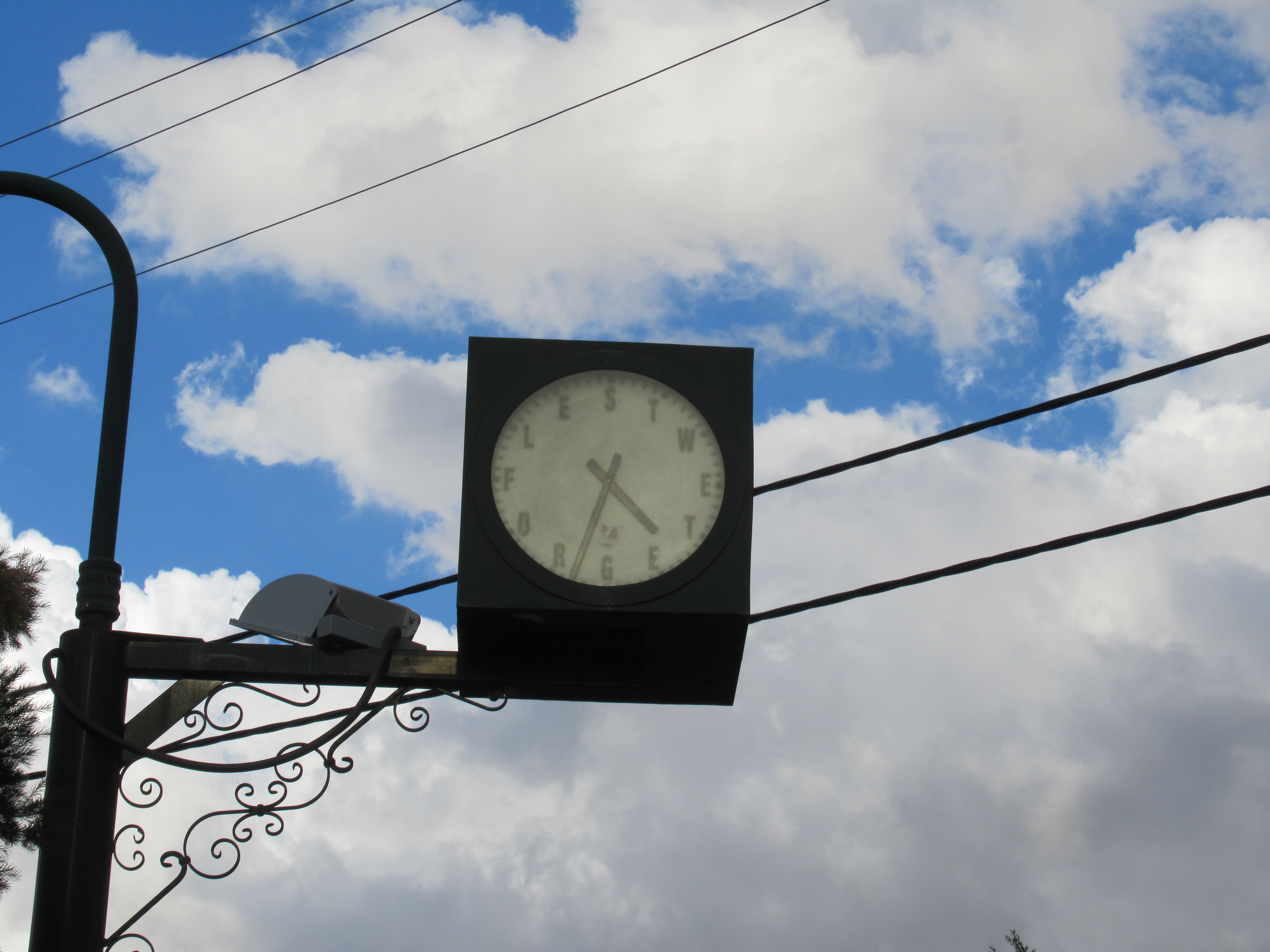
R.S.L. clock, Jandowae, Queensland, Australia. Numbers on the clock face are replaced by the words "Lest we forget".

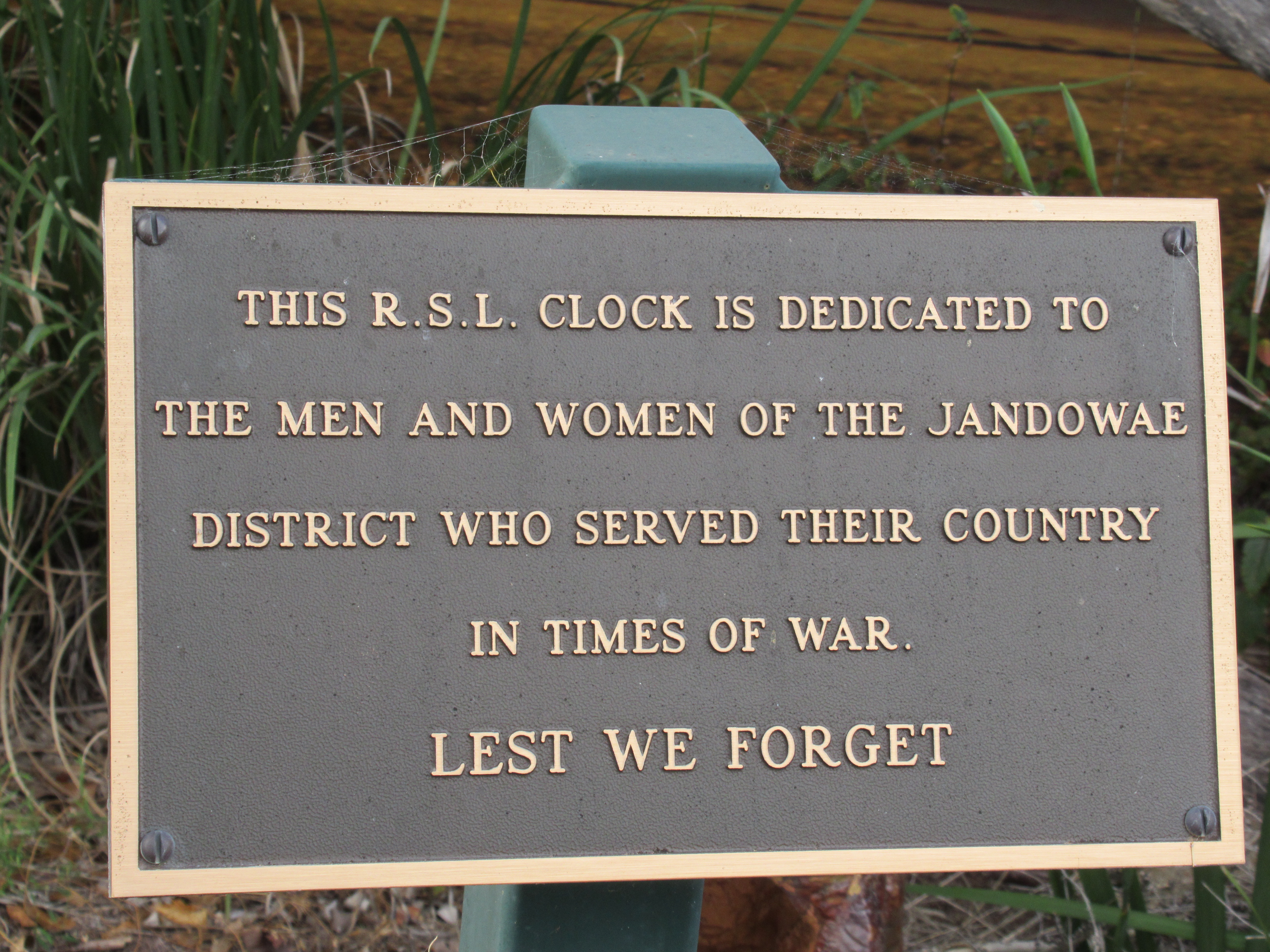
R.S.L. clock plaque, Jandowae, Queensland.

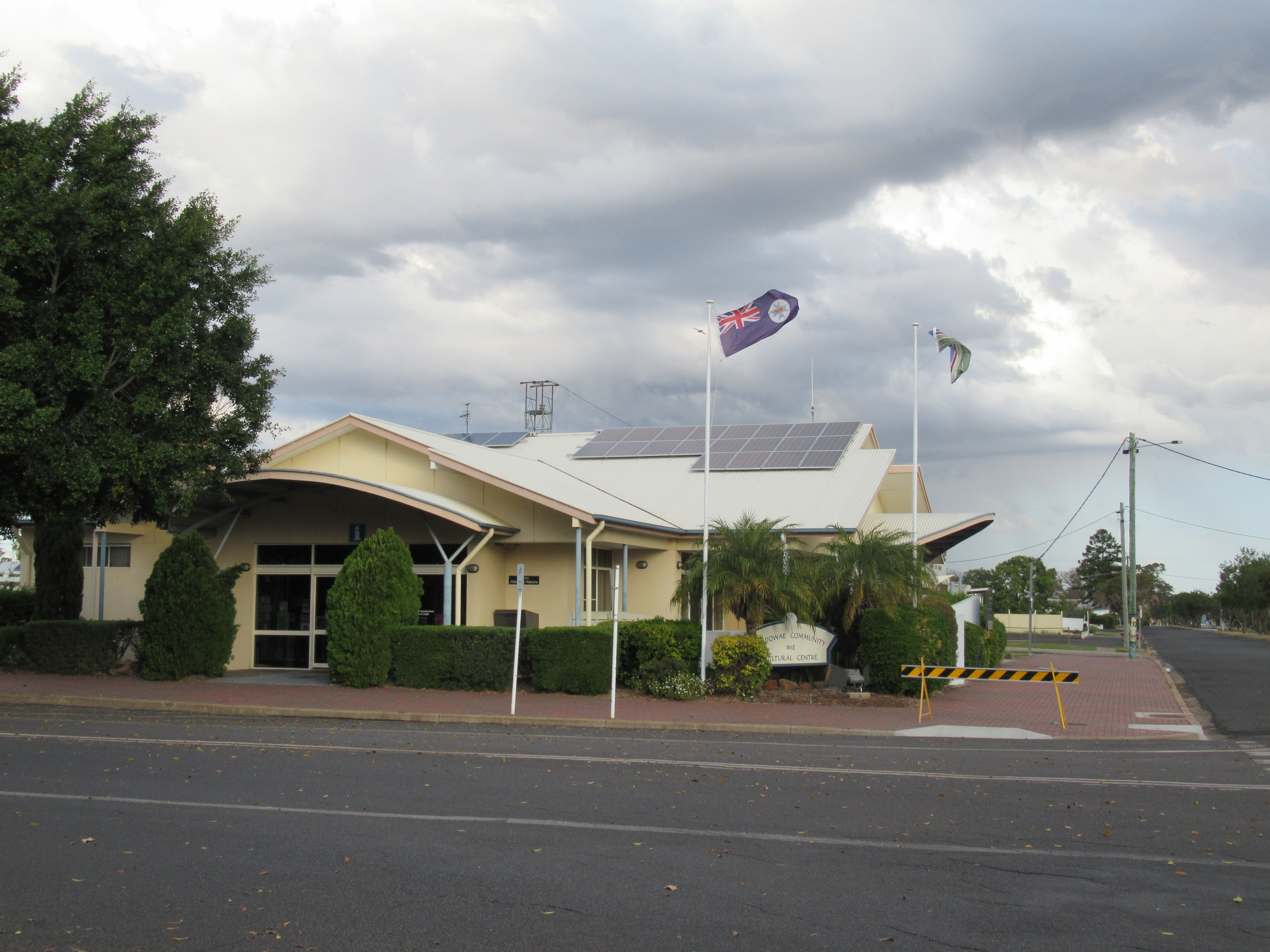
Jandowae Community and Cultural Centre, Jandowae, Queensland, Australia. September 2018
