= Indigenous Collection (Miles District Historical Village) =

The Indigenous Collection at the Miles District Historical Village is a collection of Australian Aboriginal artefacts from the local area and western Queensland, some of which are extremely rare, and has national historic significance by its association with Indigenous Australians. The Miles District in south-east Queensland supported the Barunggam people, and was a transition stop for other Aboriginal peoples.

== Background ==
The Barunggam people lived in the area from Tchanning Creek near Yuleba on the west, to Myall Creek near Dalby on the east, north to the Great Dividing Range, and south to the Moonie and Condamine watersheds. There are no known descendants in the area today, as the Barunggam were moved to Taroom in 1916, and then eventually to Cherbourg or Woorabinda.

On the sandstone slabs that abound on the banks of L Tree Creek north of Miles, grooves in the stone are clear evidence that they were popular spear sharpening spots. There were places on Dogwood Creek and Chinaman's Lagoon (about 1 kilometre (0.62 mi) south of Miles) where the Aboriginal people stopped and ate, and there are old middens of mussel shells on the west bank of the river at Condamine, and at the Round Waterhole north of Dulacca.

The region was also a transition stop for other Aboriginal peoples as they travelled through every three years until 1876, on their way to the Bunya Mountains for the ripening of the bunya nuts. The Village collection includes the "Ilbalunga Cave" as an example of a transition stop. Local Aboriginal people were involved in its creation and decorated the cave with their hand prints.

The collection also includes a map showing the traditional tribal areas, an extensive assortment of rubbing stones, boomerangs, stone axes, grinding and milling stones and other tools, predominantly from two major donors, the Keenan and the Mayfield families, as well as dilly bags and other handcrafted items. Of particular significance are a koala skin rug, an original notice regarding the Aboriginal Protection Act, and a chest plate, which are detailed below.

== Koala skin rug ==
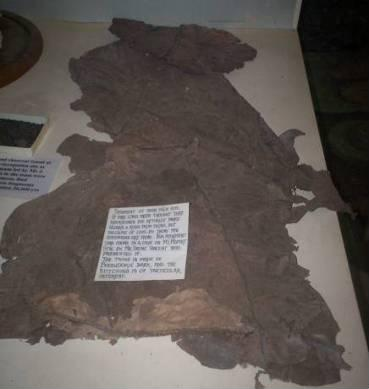
Koala Skin rug

As few rugs of Aboriginal origin are in existence today, this koala skin rug is rare and of great historical significance as a handcrafted Aboriginal artefact. It may also be useful for researching sewing and rug construction techniques. The rug was found in a cave on Mt Moffatt Station, near Roma, by Mr Dayne Vincent. The twine is made of boodioorie bark and the stitching is particularly unusual. The rug would have provided warmth and comfort due to the thick and soft nature of the koala fur.

Other koala skin rugs exist in Australian museums; however they are not of Aboriginal manufacture but made after British colonisation, when native furs were used in Australia for clothing and other wares. Millions of koalas were killed for their pelts up until the 1930s when protective measures were implemented by state governments to rebuild their numbers and stop the fur trade. Today the koala is protected by legislation in all states and territories where they are found.

== Notice regarding the Aboriginals Protection and Restriction of the Sale of Opium Act 1897 ==
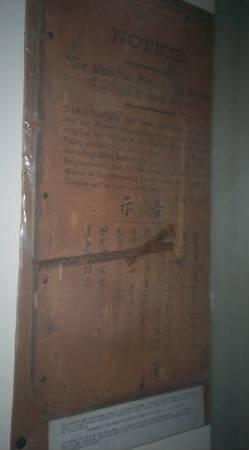
The notice

This notice about the Aboriginals Protection and Restriction of the Sale of Opium Act 1897, came from Taroom where it had been displayed in the old Police Station for over 50 years, probably since 1897. The Notice is written in English and Chinese, and could be very rare as there are no other known copies.

Eleven of the 32 sections dealt stringently with control of the supply of opium to Aboriginal people. However the Act had wider social significance as its practical outcome was oppressive and restricted the rights and freedoms of Aboriginal people.

The legislation established Aboriginal reserves – geographically isolated enclaves – to which Aboriginal people could be forcibly removed by designated Protectors of Aborigines – civil servants, police and missionaries, later controlled by and later Aboriginal Protection Boards. People were restricted to these reserves ostensibly to protect them from the ravages of European immorality and disease. Furthermore, the legislation was used to control Aboriginal people at the workplace and to remove their basic civil rights, reducing them to the position of State wards. This Act was not overturned until the Community Services Act 1984.

== King Dick of Boondie Plate ==
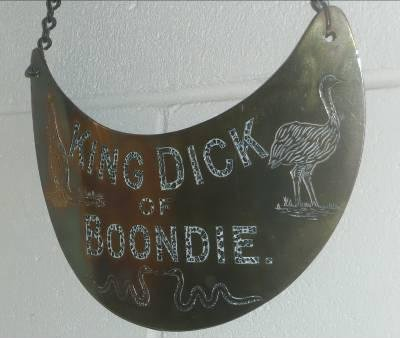
King Dick of Boondie Plate

King plates were a form of regalia used in pre-Federation Australia by white colonial authorities to recognise local Aboriginal leaders. This chest plate belonged to a chief of the Palparara tribe of western Queensland in the Winton – Windorah area, near Julia Creek.

King plates were metallic crescent-shaped plaques worn around the neck which sat across the chest. This chest plate belonged to King Dick of Boondie. A 'boondie' is an Australian term for a sand cake that is carved from, or broken off, a larger, hardened pocket of sand and can be thrown like a snow ball. Boondies are common in Western Queensland.

Known 'Kings' of the Miles district were King Billy of Tiereyboo who came in to live at Chinaman's Lagoon (near Miles) in the early 1900s, and King Sandy of Moraby. Tiereyboo was one of the early holdings taken up in this area, and was situated between the Condamine River and Dogwood Creek, and Moraby was an adjoining early holding further west.

== See also ==
- Australian Aboriginal culture
