= Mcgrory Falls =

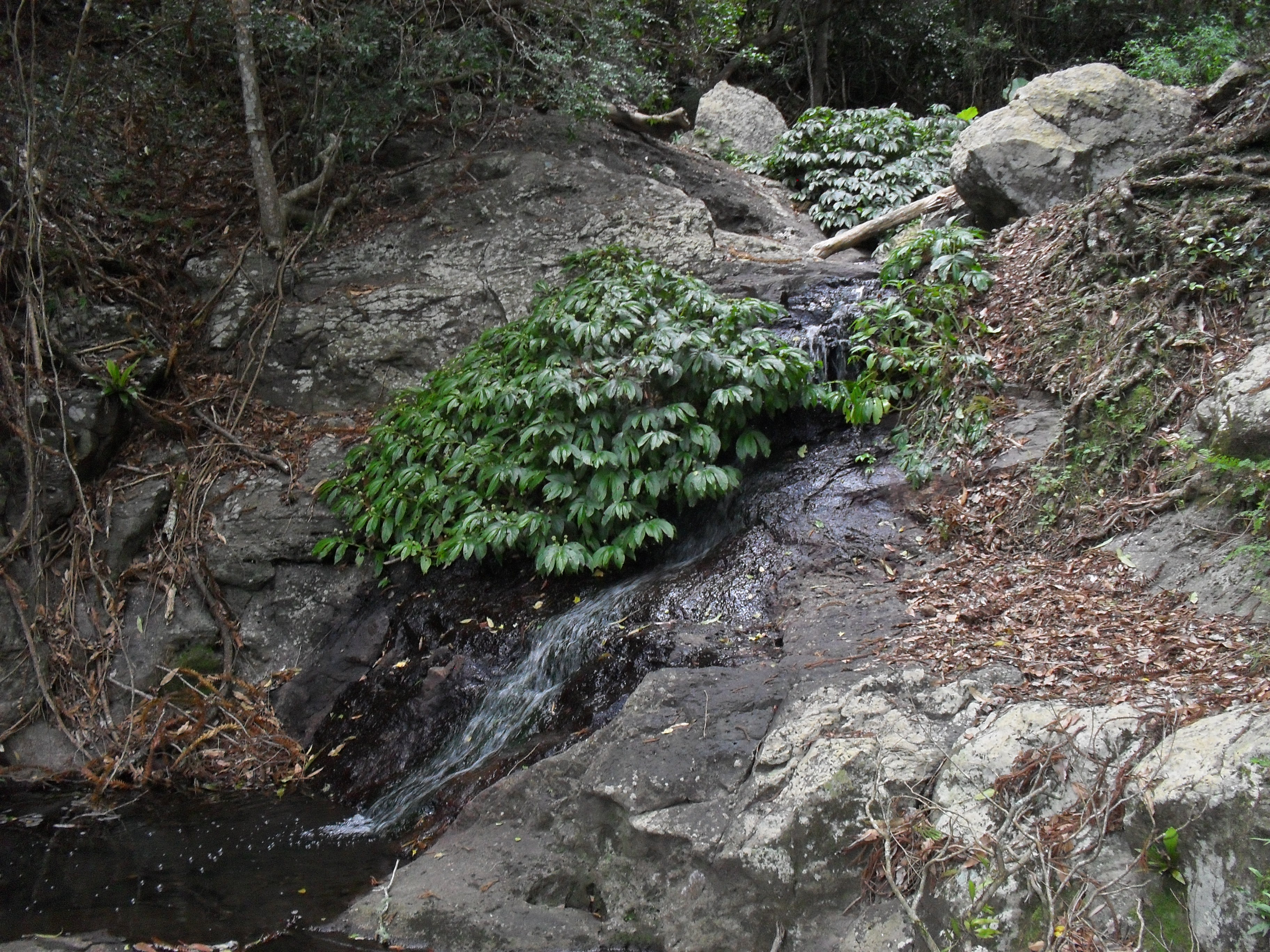
- Small cascade above Mcgrory Falls

- Location within Queensland
- Location: Bunya Mountains, Australia
- Coordinates: 26°52′32″S 152°36′06″E
- Type: Plunge
- Total height: 50 m (160 ft)
- Number of drops: 1
- Watercourse: Saddle-tree Creek

Mcgrory Falls is a waterfall on Saddle-tree Creek, a tributary of the Burnett River, in Queensland, Australia. The waterfall is located within the Bunya Mountains National Park, in the South Burnett Region, near the village of Dandabah in the Bunya Mountains. Like other smaller waterfalls in the area, Mcgrory Falls is surrounded by dense bush and pine forest.

== Access ==
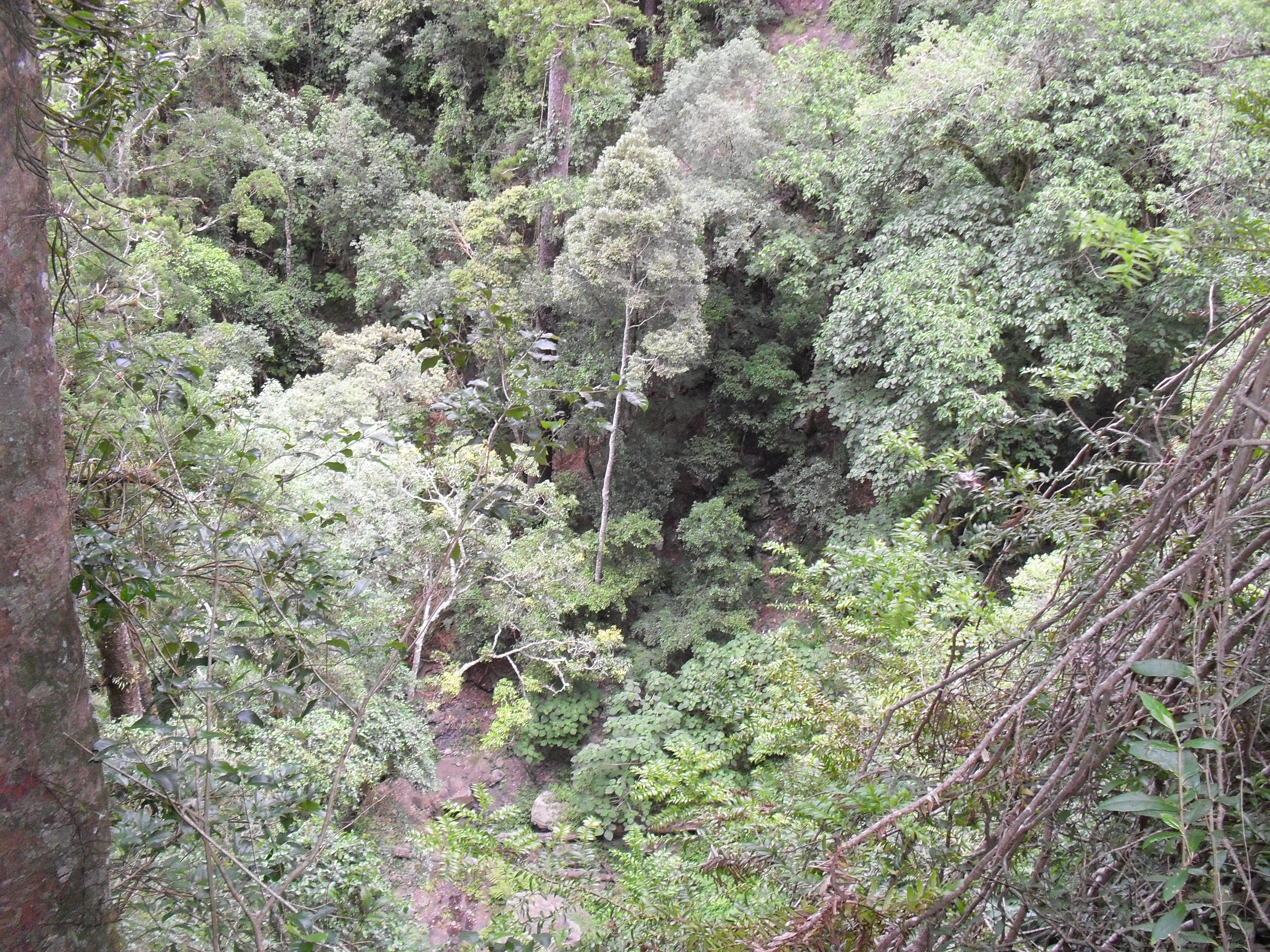
The view of below the falls from Mcgrory Lookout.

The top of the falls are the easiest point to get to as a well used track leads there from the bottom of Festoon Falls. The view is limited, though there is a good view over pine gorge. Looking over the falls is very dangerous as the cliff edges are obstructed by plants. An unformed lookout with the best views is to the left rim just metres from the waterfall. Care should always be taken near the sheer edges, as many fall forty metres to the gorge below.

== See also ==
- List of waterfalls
- List of waterfalls in Australia
