= Tim Shea Falls =

- Location within Queensland
- Location: Bunya Mountains, Australia
- Coordinates: 26°52′21″S 151°35′38″E
- Type: Plunge/Cascade
- Total height: 10 m (33 ft)
- Number of drops: 1
- Watercourse: Tim Shea Creek

Tim Shea Falls is a waterfall on Tim Shea Creek, a tributary of the Burnett River, in Queensland, Australia. The waterfall is located within the Bunya Mountains National Park, in the South Burnett Region, near the village of Dandabah in the Bunya Mountains. Like other waterfalls in the area, Tim Shea Falls is surrounded by dense bush and pine forest.

== Access ==
The falls are easily accessed by a two kilometre maintained walking track from Dandabah; the track is unsuitable for wheelchairs and bicycles, but is quite easy on foot.

== See also ==
- List of waterfalls
- List of waterfalls in Australia
