= Hector Munro (surveyor) =

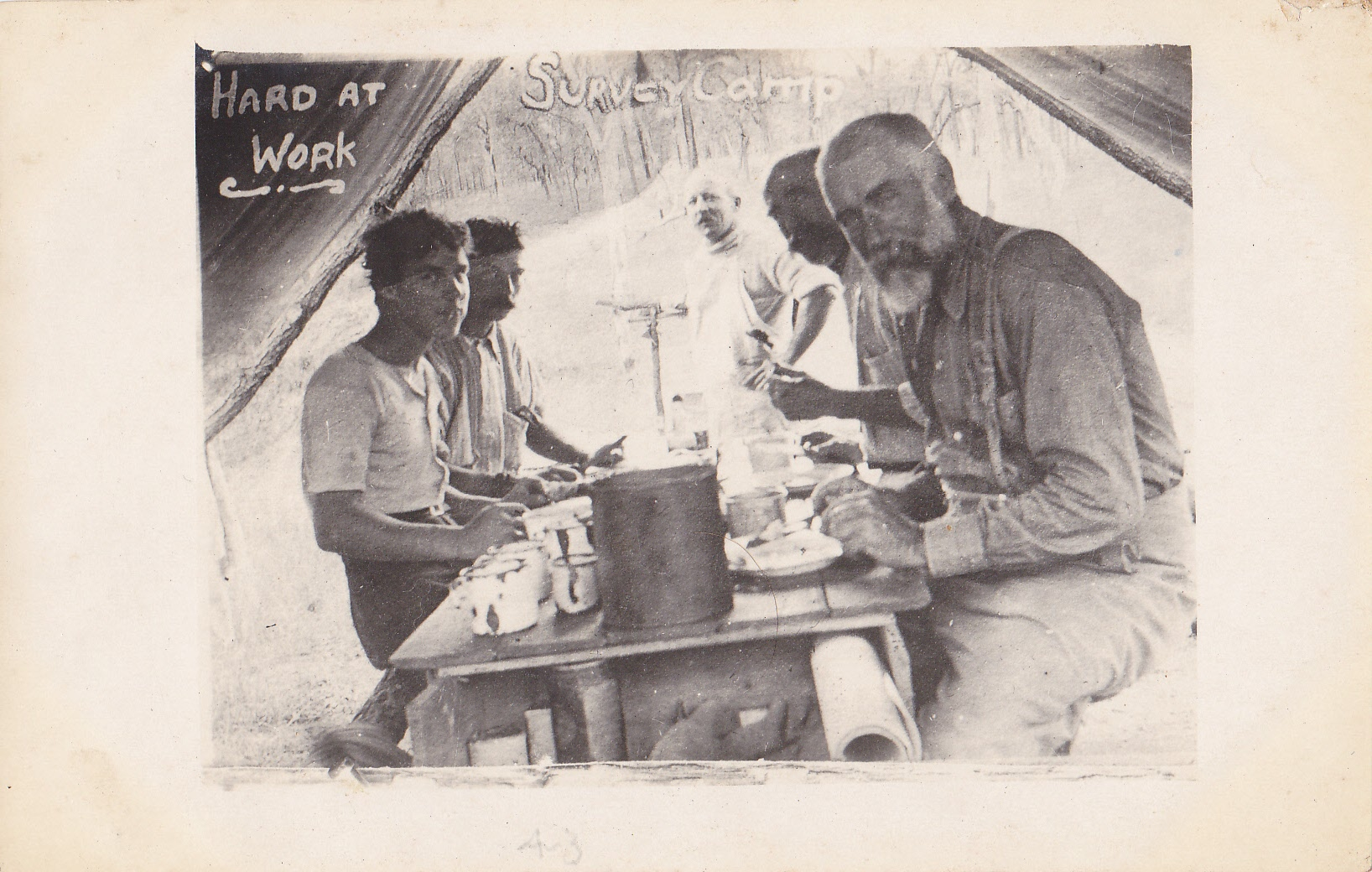
- Munro at survey camp's mealtime – circa 1910
- Born: 23 September 1859; Boondooma Station, Queensland, Australia
- Died: 18 December 1930 (aged 71)
- Occupation: Surveyor
- Spouse: Mary Kendall (after 1896)

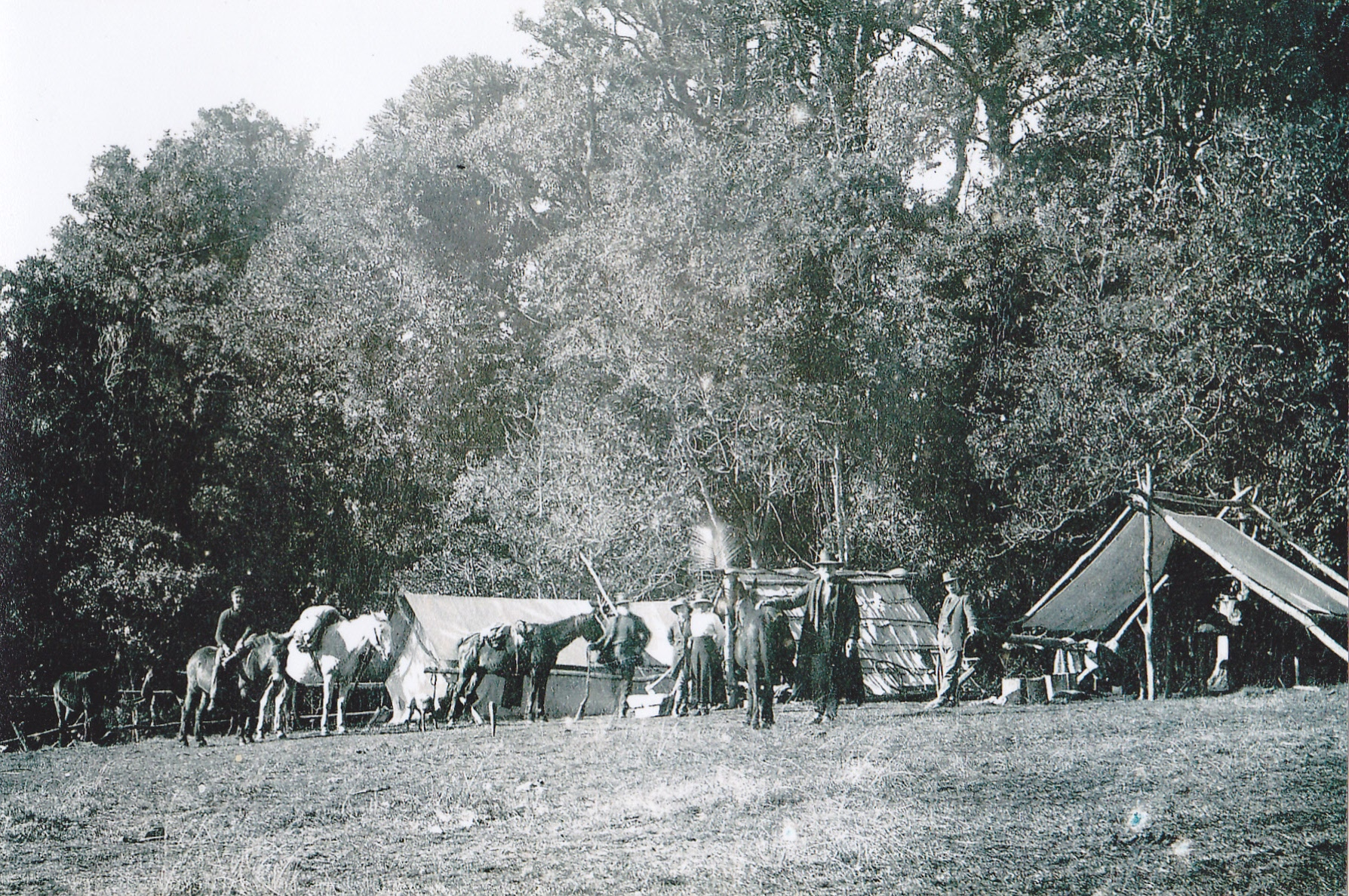
Munro's Camp Bunya Mts – circa 1910

Hector Munro (23 September 1859 – 18 December 1930) was the eldest son of George Munro, born in 'Boondooma Station', Queensland, which was managed by his father. He was educated at Ipswich Grammar School and finished his education becoming a qualified surveyor. His childhood at 'Boondooma' was spent in the company of the local aboriginal people, the Wakka. This instilled a lifelong interest in aboriginal culture, language, and mores. An avid photographer, he has left a lasting legacy of both written work and photographs of Aboriginals, particularly around the Bunya Mountains.

He worked as a surveyor in northern Queensland and then spent most of the rest of his working life surveying most of the lands in the South Burnett region including years of work in the Bunya Mountains. He married Mary Kendall on 23 September 1896 in the Presbyterian Church in Nanango officiated by Reverend Andrew Wilson from Esk.
