= Festoon Falls =

Waterfall in Queensland, Australia

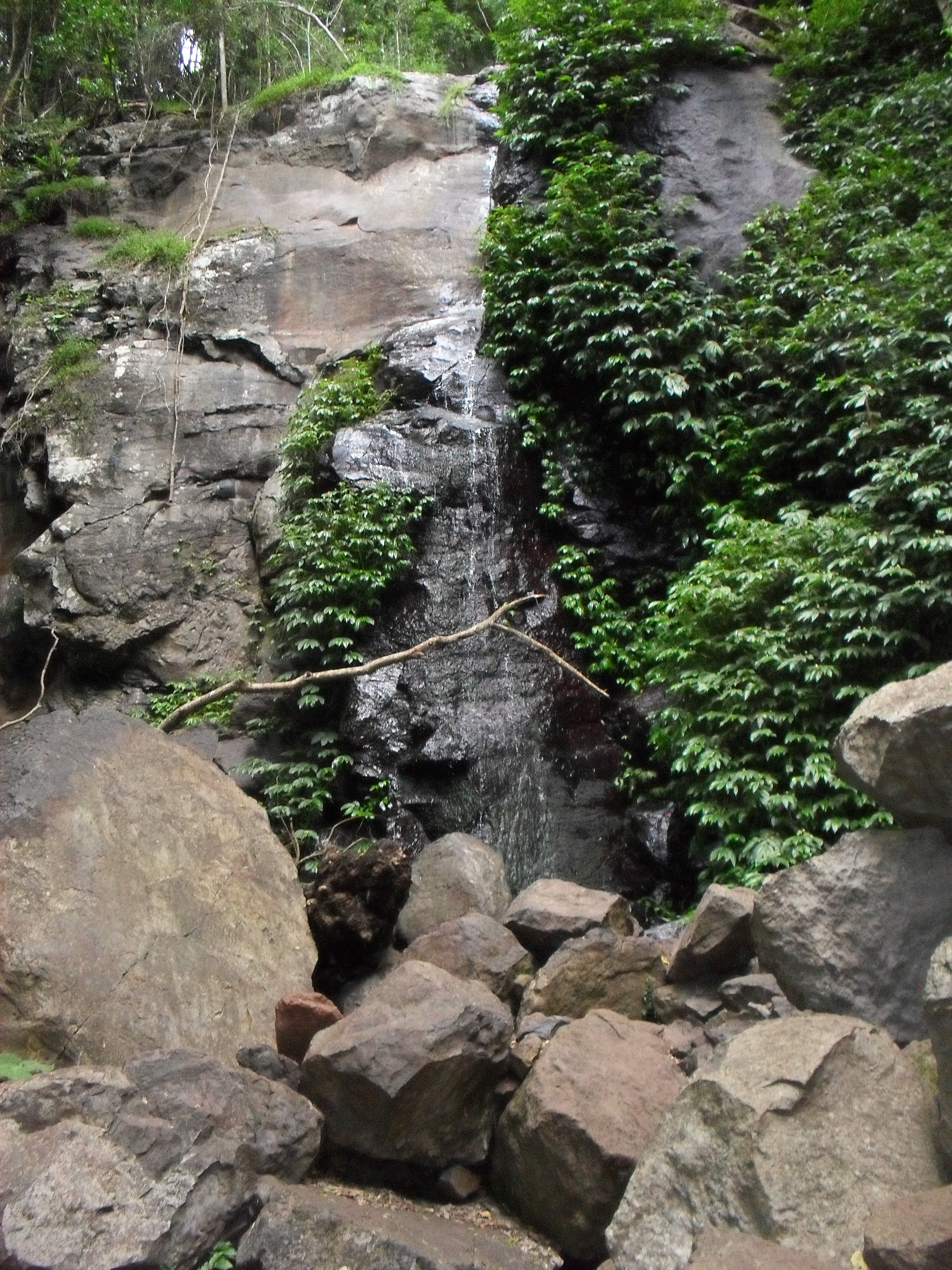
- The view from the base of the falls.

- Location within Queensland
- Location: Bunya Mountains, Australia
- Coordinates: 26°52′32″S 151°36′02″E
- Type: Plunge
- Total height: 20 metres (66 ft)
- Number of drops: 1
- Watercourse: Saddle-tree Creek

Festoon Falls is a waterfall on Saddle-tree Creek, a tributary of the Burnet River, in Queensland, Australia. The waterfall is located within the Bunya Mountains National Park, in the South Burnett Region, near the village of Dandabah in the Bunya Mountains. Like other waterfalls in the area, Festoon Falls is surrounded by dense bush and pine forest.

== Access ==
The falls are easily accessed by a 700-metre (2,300 ft) maintained walking track from Dandabah; the track is unsuitable for wheelchairs and bicycles, but is quite easy on foot.

== See also ==
- List of waterfalls in Australia
