= Baruŋgam =

Aboriginal Australian people

The Baruŋgam are an Aboriginal Australian people of Southeast Queensland.

== Language ==
The earliest wordlist of the Barunggam language was compiled by Harriott Barlow, from Warkon Station on the Balonne River, and which was published in 1873.

== Country ==
The Baruŋgam had an estimated 7,900 square miles (20,000 km^{2}) of tribal land in Queensland's Western Downs Region, reaching from the headwaters of the Condamine River east of Jackson to the vicinity of Dalby. Their southeastern neighbours were the Jarowair. The northeastern border with the Wakawaka lay around Charley Creek across to the Great Dividing Range, while its westward extension went to the area of Wongorgera and Woleebee, beyond which were the Mandandanji. The southern limits were at Tara, including also Chinchilla and Jandowae.

== History ==
The lands west and southeast of Brisbane struck early settlers as lush in their park-like landscapes, parts of which presented to the traveler grasslands so tall they reached to the height of the heads of riders on horseback. According to the historian Raymond Evans, the colonial takeover of the rich lands of not only the Baruŋgam, but also those of the Geynyon, Jarowair and Giabal (Note: Presuming this is the tribe alluded to when Evans writes Gairbal (Evans 2007, p. 52)) was accomplished in a short 18 months in the early 1840s, when predominantly Scots settlers, accompanied by convicts and furnished with substantial stands of arms, and having excellent political connections in Brisbane, drove in roughly 100,000 sheep and 5,000 head of cattle.

== Alternative names ==
- Barungam
- Gogai, Cogai
- Kogai (a language name used also for their western tribal neighbours' languages)
- Murrumgama, Murrungama, Murrumningama
- Parrungoom

Source: Tindale 1974, p. 165

== Notable Baruŋgam ==
Charles Samuels (athlete)

== See also ==
- Indigenous Collection (Miles District Historical Village)

== Sources ==
- Barlow, Harriott (1873). "Vocabulary of Aboriginal Dialects of Queensland". The Journal of the Anthropological Institute of Great Britain and Ireland. 2: 165–175. doi:10.2307/2841159. JSTOR 2841159.
- Evans, Raymond (2007). A History of Queensland. Cambridge University Press. ISBN 978-0521876926.
- Tindale, Norman Barnett (1974). "Barunggam (QLD)". Aboriginal Tribes of Australia: Their Terrain, Environmental Controls, Distribution, Limits, and Proper Names. Australian National University Press. Archived from the original on 19 October 2018.
