= Giabal =

Indigenous Australian tribe

The Giabal, also known as the Gomaingguru, were an indigenous Australian tribe of southern Queensland.

== Country ==
The Giabal ranged over some 7,300 square kilometres (2,800 mi^{2}) of territory which lay between Allora and around Dalby. Their eastern extension ran close to Gatton, while their western frontier reached west to Millmerran. According to Stephen Wurm and Suzanne Kite, the Giabal were the southernmost branch of the Baruŋgam.

== History of contact ==
The first historical notice we have of them appear in an account written by William Ridley, a missionary who undertook a journey among the tribes of southern Queensland in 1855. He stated that the tribe whom he encountered in October of that year at Yandilla, spoke a language called "Paiamba". Ridley's entry is very brief:

Thence I came up the Weir, a tributary of the Macintyre; at four stations thereon, I met with forty blacks; all speak Pikumbul, and know something of Kamilaroi.From the head of the Weir, I again crossed the Downs by Yandilla, where I found nearly a dozen blacks who speak Paiamba, a dialect containing a few words like those of the Brisbane tribes, but which was for the most part quite strange to me.

== Alternative names ==
- Gitabal (scribal error)
- Gomaingguru ('Men of the Condamine')
- Paiamba

Source: Tindale 1974, p. 168

== Sources ==
- Kite, Suzanne; Wurm, Stephen Adolphus (2004). The Duu ṉidjawu Language of the Southeast Queensland: Grammar, Texts and Vocabulary. Research School of Pacific and Asian Studies. ISBN 978-0-858-83550-4.
- Mathews, R. H. (January 1898). "Initiation ceremonies of some Queensland tribes". Proceedings of the American Philosophical Society. 37 (157): 54–73. JSTOR 983694.
- Ridley, William (1861). "Journal of a missionary tour among the aborigines in the year 1855" (PDF). In Lang, John Dunmore (ed.). Queensland. Australia. A Highly Eligible Field for Emigration for the Future Cotton-Field of Great Britain. Charing Cross, London: Edward Stanford. pp. 435–445.
- Tindale, Norman Barnett (1974). "Giabal (QLD)". Aboriginal Tribes of Australia: Their Terrain, Environmental Controls, Distribution, Limits, and Proper Names. Australian National University Press. Archived from the original on 21 March 2018.
