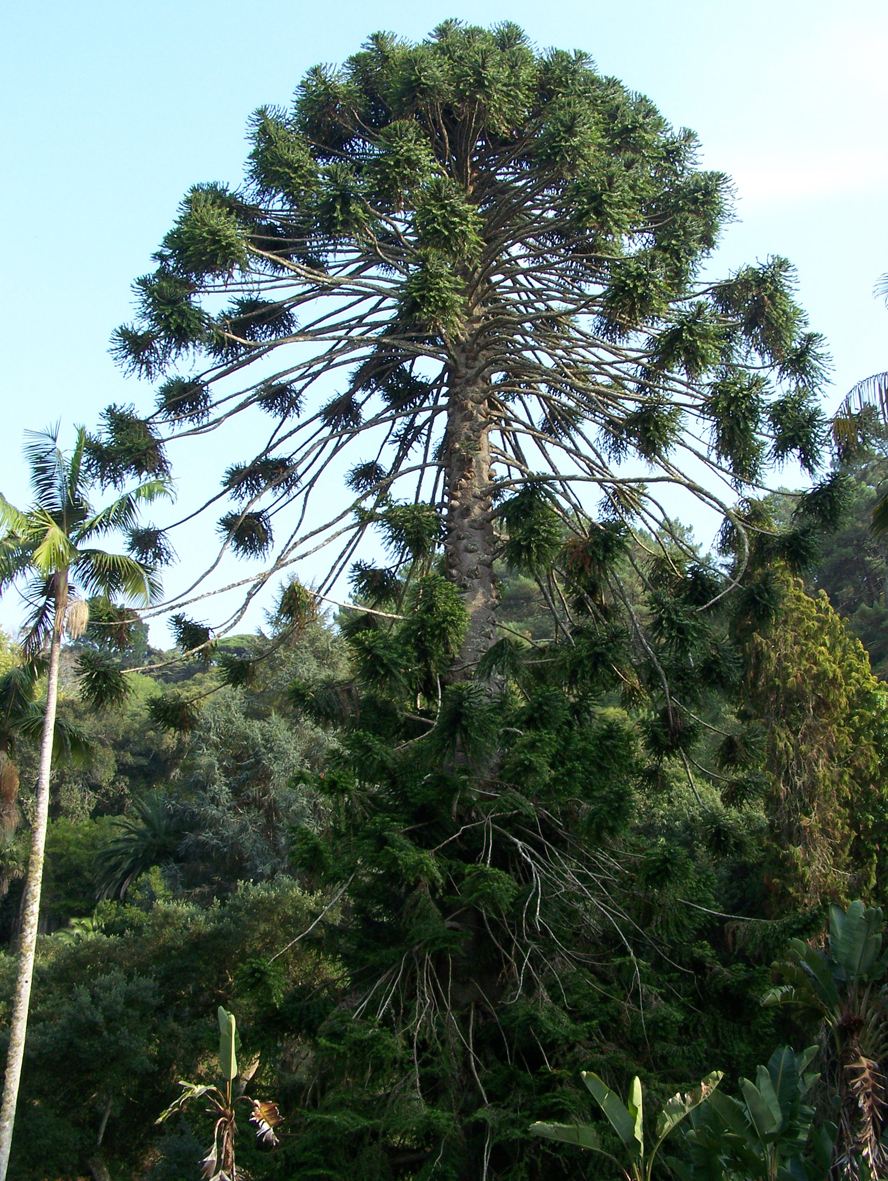

Conservation status
- Least Concern (IUCN 3.1)
- Least Concern (NCA)

Scientific classification
- Kingdom: Plantae
- Clade: Tracheophytes
- Clade: Gymnosperms
- Division: Pinophyta
- Class: Pinopsida
- Order: Araucariales
- Family: Araucariaceae
- Genus: Araucaria
- Section: A. sect. Bunya
- Species: A. bidwillii

Binomial name
- Araucaria bidwillii Hook., 1843

= Araucaria bidwillii =

Bunya pine

Species of tree native to Australia

Araucaria bidwillii, commonly known as the bunya pine, bunya, banya or bunya-bunya, is a large coniferous tree in the family Araucariaceae which is endemic to Australia. Its natural range is southeast Queensland with two very small, disjunct populations in northeast Queensland's World Heritage listed Wet Tropics. There are many planted specimens on the Atherton Tableland, in New South Wales, and around the Perth metropolitan area, and it has also been widely planted in other parts of the world. They are very tall trees – the tallest living individual is in Bunya Mountains National Park and was reported by Robert Van Pelt in January 2003 to be 51.5 m (169 ft) in height.

== Description ==
Araucaria bidwillii will grow to a height of 50 m (160 ft) with a single unbranched trunk up to 1.5 m (4 ft 11 in) diameter, which has dark brown or black flaky bark. The branches are produced in whorls at regular intervals along the trunk, with leaf-bearing branchlets crowded at their ends. The branches are held more or less horizontally – those towards the top of the trunk may be somewhat ascending, those on the lowest section of the trunk may be somewhat drooping. This arrangement gives the tree a very distinctive egg-shaped silhouette.

The leaves are small and rigid with a sharp tip which can easily penetrate the skin. They are narrowly triangular, broad at the base and sessile (without a stem). They measure up to 5 cm (2.0 in) long by 1 cm (0.4 in) wide with fine longitudinal venation, glossy green above and paler underneath. The leaf arrangement is both distichous and decussate (referred to as secondarily distichous) – that is, one pair of leaves are produced on the twig opposite each other, and the next pair above is rotated around the twig 90° to them, and so on.

The cones are terminal, the male (or pollen) cone is a spike up to 20 cm (7.9 in) long which matures around October to November. The female (or seed) cone is much larger, reaching up to 30 cm (12 in) long and 20 cm (7.9 in) wide, which is roughly equivalent to a rugby ball. At maturity, which occurs from December through to March, female cones are green with 50–100 pointed segments, each of which encloses a seed, and they can weigh up to 10 kg. Both seed and pollen cones are some of the largest of all conifer species.

The edible seeds, known as bunya nuts, measure between 2.5 cm (1.0 in) and 5 cm (2.0 in) long and are ovoid to long-elliptic.

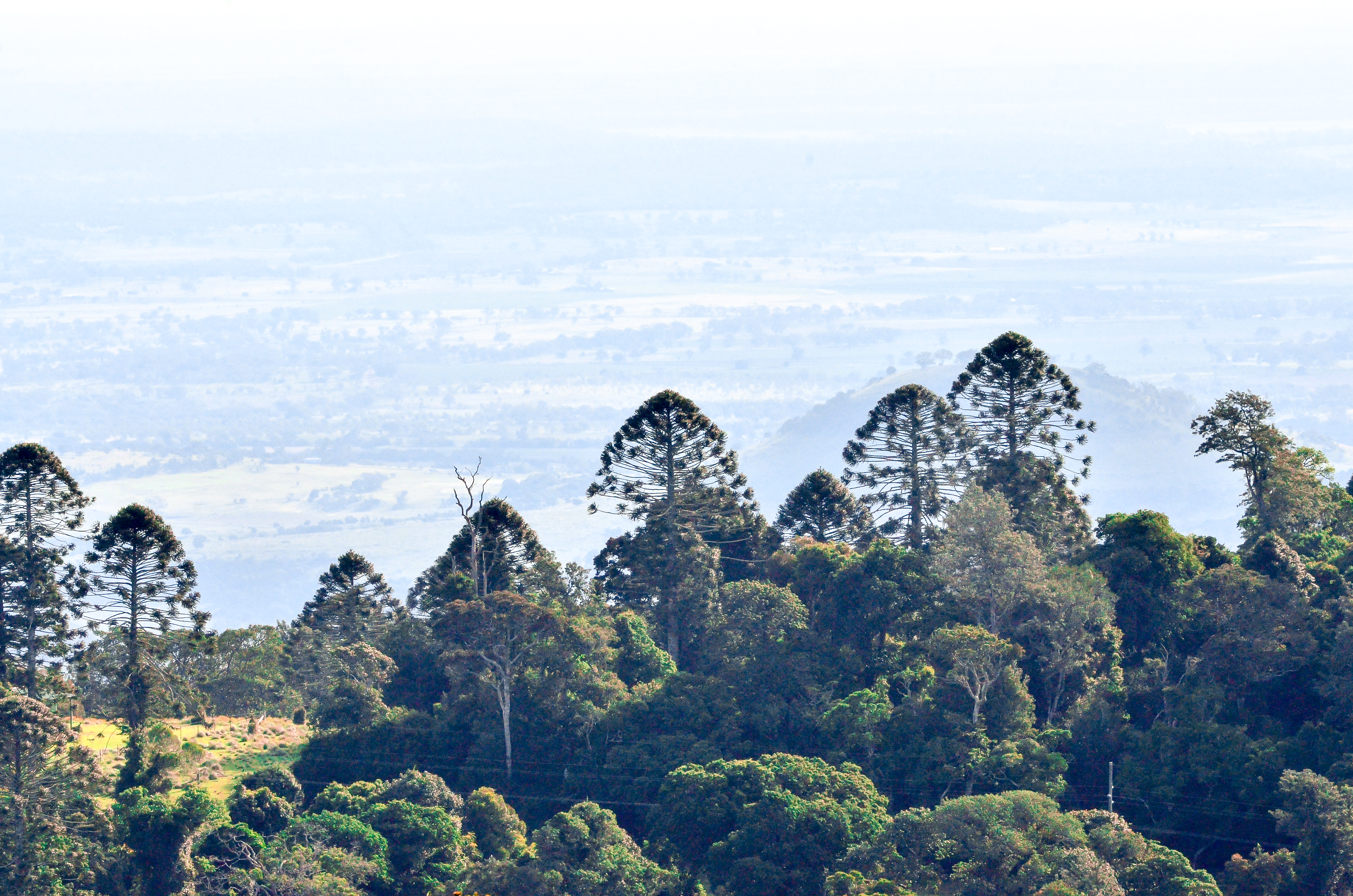
Distinctive canopies seen at Bunya Mountains

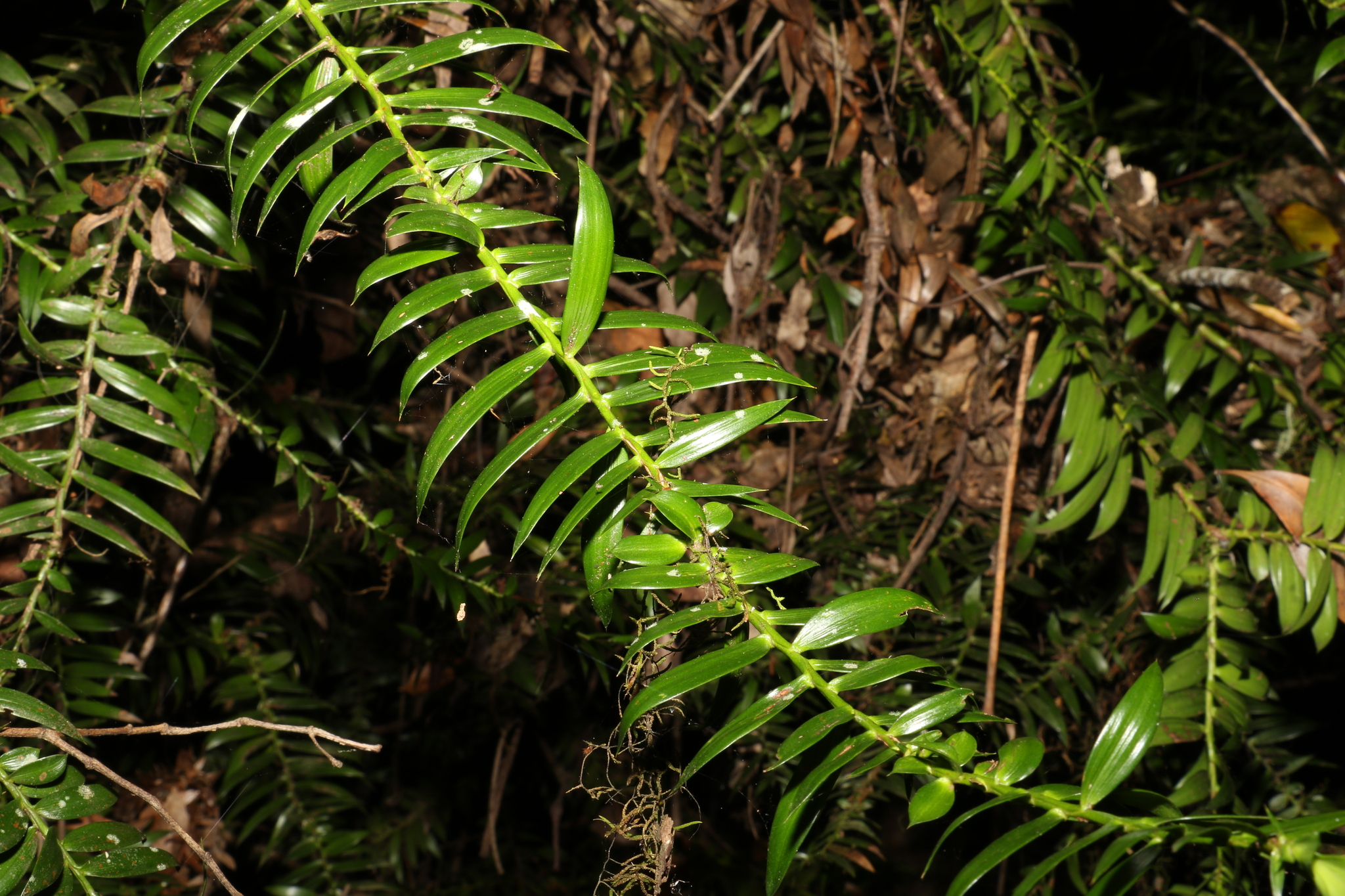
Close up of leaves

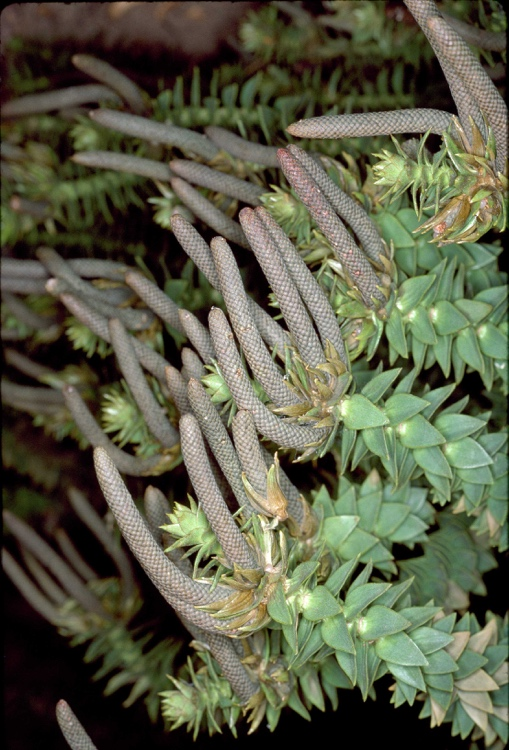
Male cones

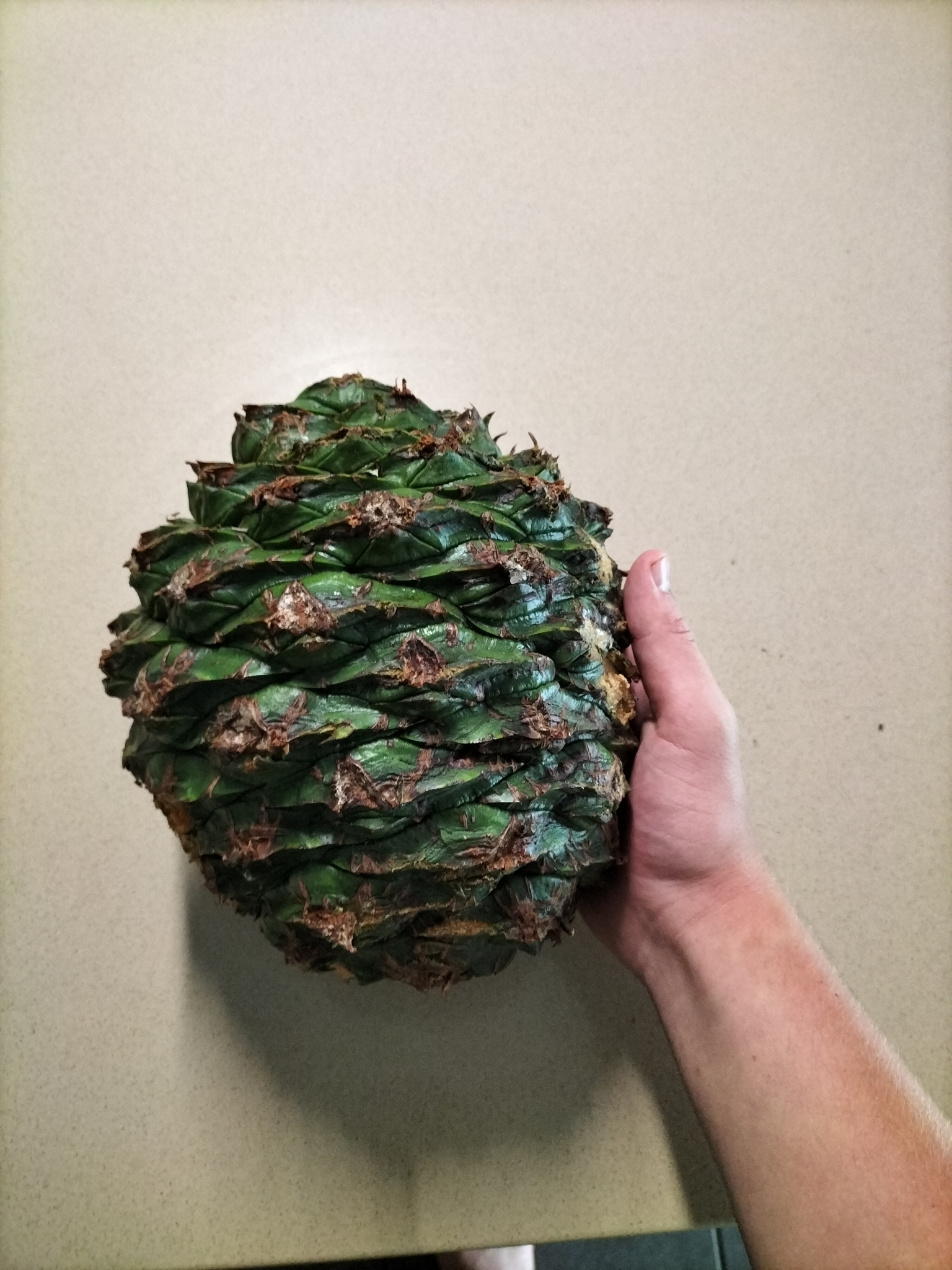
Female cone

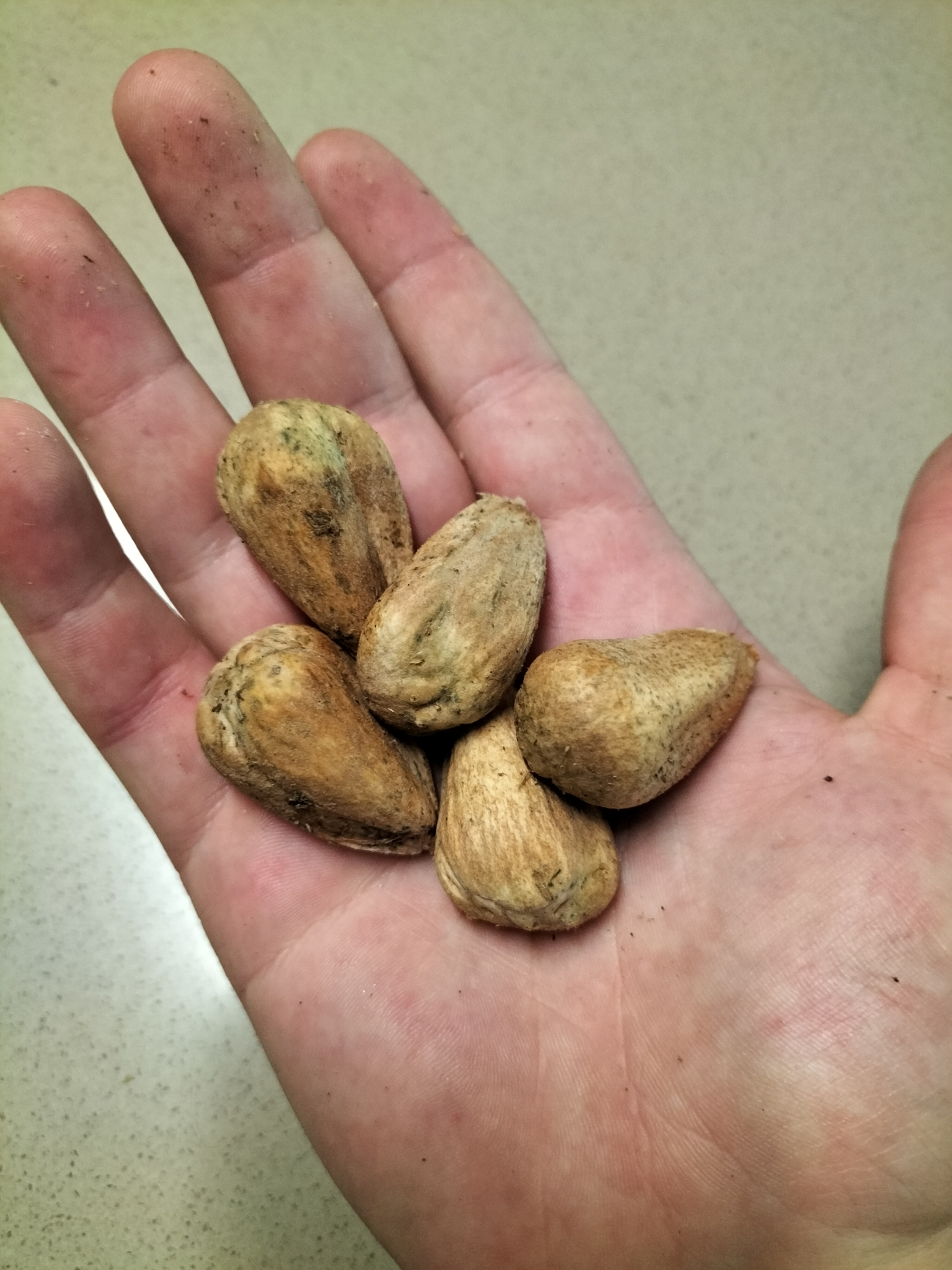
Seeds

=== Architecture ===
In the 1970s, botanists Hallé, Oldeman and Tomlinson studied the growth patterns of tropical trees and described a set of 23 "architectural models", named after various botanists, which can be seen as different growth strategy to occupy space. Araucaria bidwillii, like many species from the Araucariaceae family and the fir genus, changes its structural model over time. Initially its follows Massart's model (a single, upright trunk that grows steadily and produces neat, horizontal layers of branches at regular intervals) and gradually changes to Rauh's model (like Massart's, but here each branch grows structurally similar to the trunk, with smaller branches branching off of it.)

=== Phenology ===
The trees' pollen cones appear in April and mature in September or October. The cones require fifteen months to mature, and the cones fall 17 to 18 months after pollination in late January to early March from the coast to the current Bunya Mountains. When there is heavy rainfall or drought, pollination may vary.

== Taxonomy ==
The species was described by the English botanist William Jackson Hooker in 1843, based on material collected in the "Mount Brisbane range of hills, 70 miles N.W. of Moreton Bay" by John Carne Bidwill in 1842. Hooker states in his paper that Bidwill took "not only branches and cones and male flowers, but also a healthy young living plant" to England where Hooker set about describing the new species, and his paper (titled "Figure and description of a new species of Araucaria from Moreton Bay, New Holland") was published in his own journal London Journal of Botany.

=== Etymology ===
The genus name Araucaria is taken from the Spanish word Araucanía, the name of the area in Chile where the first species of this genus originated, and/or Araucanos, the Spanish word for the original inhabitants of the area. Hooker coined the species epithet in honour of Bidwill, for his efforts in collecting specimens and bringing them to him.

=== Vernacular names ===
In various Australian Aboriginal languages, this tree is known as banya (anglicised as bunya), bonye, bon-yi (in Gubbi Gubbi), bunyi or bunya-bunya, leading to its common name 'bunya pine'. It is also less-known as the false monkey puzzle tree (not to be confused with Araucaria araucana, the monkey puzzle tree).

== Evolution ==
The bunya pine is a member of the Section Bunya of the genus Araucaria, and is the sole extant species within it. This section is thought to have been most widespread in the Mesozoic – fossils from the Jurassic period with cone morphology similar to A. bidwillii have been found in the UK (Araucaria sphaerocarpa) and South America (Araucaria mirabilis)

== Distribution ==
At the start of British occupation, A. bidwillii was abundant in southern Queensland, occurring in large groves or sprinkled regularly as an emergent species throughout other forest types on the upper Stanley and Brisbane Rivers, Sunshine Coast hinterland (especially the Blackall Range and Maleny), and also towards and on the Bunya Mountains.

Two more natural, but very small and very isolated, populations of the species occur approximately 1,500 km (930 mi) to the north, in the wet tropics region of northeastern Queensland – one close to Cannabullen Falls on the Atherton Tableland, and the other in the Mount Lewis National Park.

Today, the southeast Queensland populations exist as very small groves or single trees in its former range, except on and near the Bunya Mountains, where it is still fairly prolific, while the populations in north Queensland remain stable.

The limited distribution of A. bidwillii in Australia is in part due to poor seed dispersal, and also the drying out of the Australian continent over the millennia, leading to a reduction of areas with suitable climatic zones for rainforest.

== Ecology ==
A variety of birds and animals, including sulphur-crested cockatoos (Cacatua galerita), short-eared possums (Trichosurus caninus), fawn-footed melomys (Melomys cervinipes), and wallabies are known to eat the seeds. The cockatoos are also a dispersal agent as they will carry seeds to a distant perch to eat, but may drop them on the way.

The suggestion that extinct large animals (initially dinosaurs and later the Australian megafauna) may have been dispersers for the bunya is reasonable, given the size of the seeds and their energy content, but difficult to confirm given the incompleteness of the fossil record for coprolites.

A. bidwillii has an unusual cryptogeal seed germination in which the seeds develop to form an underground tuber from which the aerial shoot later emerges. The actual emergence of the seed is then known to occur over several years presumably as a strategy to allow the seedlings to emerge under optimum climatic conditions or, it has been suggested, to avoid fire. This erratic germination has been one of the main problems in silviculture of the species.

A problem in small forestry plantations of the bunya pine in Southeast Queensland is the introduction of red deer (Cervus elaphus). Unlike possums and rodents, the deer eat bunya cones while still intact, preventing their dispersal.

== Cultural significance ==
The bunya, bonye, bunyi, bunya-bunya or banya tree produces edible kernels. The ripe cones fall to the ground. Each segment contains a kernel in a tough protective shell, which will split when boiled or put in a fire. The flavour of the kernel is often compared to a chestnut, although it is less intense in terms of aroma and flavour. The savory flavour and aroma is also comparable to cooked potato.

The cones were a very important food source for native Australians – each Aboriginal family would own a group of trees and these would be passed down from generation to generation. This is said to be the only case of hereditary personal property owned by the Aboriginal people.

After the cones had fallen and the fruit was ripe, a large festival harvest would sometimes occur, between two and seven years apart. The people of the region would set aside differences and gather in the Bon-yi Mountains (Bunya Mountains) to feast on the kernels. The local people, who were bound by custodial obligations and rights, sent out messengers to invite people from hundreds of kilometres to meet at specific sites. The meetings involved Aboriginal ceremonies, dispute settlements and fights, marriage arrangements and the trading of goods.

In what was probably Australia's largest Indigenous event, diverse tribes – up to thousands of people – once travelled great distances (from as far as Charleville, Bundaberg, Dubbo and Grafton) to the gatherings. They stayed for months, to celebrate and feast on the bunya nut. The bunya gatherings were an armistice accompanied by much trade exchange, and discussions and negotiations over marriage and regional issues. Due to the sacred status of the bunyas, some tribes would not camp amongst these trees. Also in some regions, the tree was never to be cut.

Representatives of many different groups from across southern Queensland and northern New South Wales would meet to discuss important issues relating to the environment, social relationships, politics and The Dreaming lore, feasting and sharing dance ceremonies. Many conflicts would be settled at this event, and consequences for breaches of laws were discussed.

A Bunya festival was recorded by Thomas Petrie (1831–1910), who went with the Aboriginal people of Brisbane at the age of 14 to the festival at the Bunya Range (now the Blackall Range in the hinterland area of the Sunshine Coast). His daughter, Constance Petrie, put down his stories in which he said that the trees fruited at three-year intervals. The three-year interval may not be correct. Ludwig Leichhardt wrote in 1844 of his expedition to the Bunya feast.

In 1842, the government of what was then the Colony of New South Wales published a notice in the N.S.W. Government Gazette which prohibited settlers from occupying land or cutting timber within a proclaimed "Bunya district". This may have been in recognition of the local Aboriginal people's close association with these trees, or their "fierce protection" of them. Regardless, the proclamation was repealed in 1860 in one of the first acts of the government of the newly created Colony of Queensland. The Aboriginal people were eventually driven out of the forests and the festivals ceased. The forests were felled for timber and cleared to make way for cultivation.

=== Today ===
Indigenous groups such as the Wakawaka, Githabul, Kabi Kabi, Jarowair, Goreng goreng, Butchulla, Quandamooka, Baruŋgam, Yiman and Wulili have continued cultural and spiritual connections to the Bunya Mountains to this day. A number of strategies including the use of traditional ecological knowledge have been incorporated into the current management practices of the national park and conservation reserves with the Bunya Murri Ranger project currently operating in the mountains.

== Uses ==
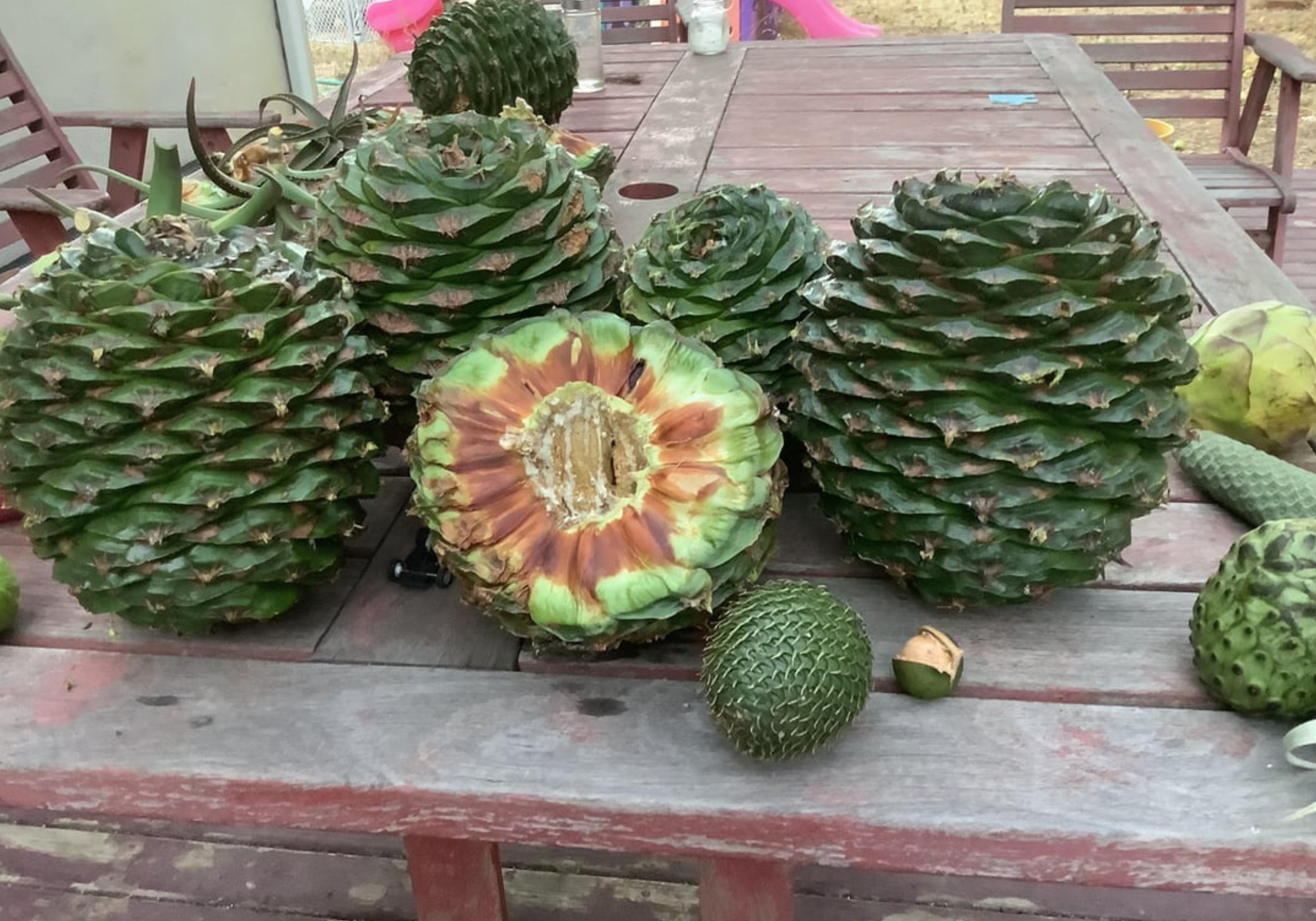
Whole cones and a cone cracked open to reveal the insides

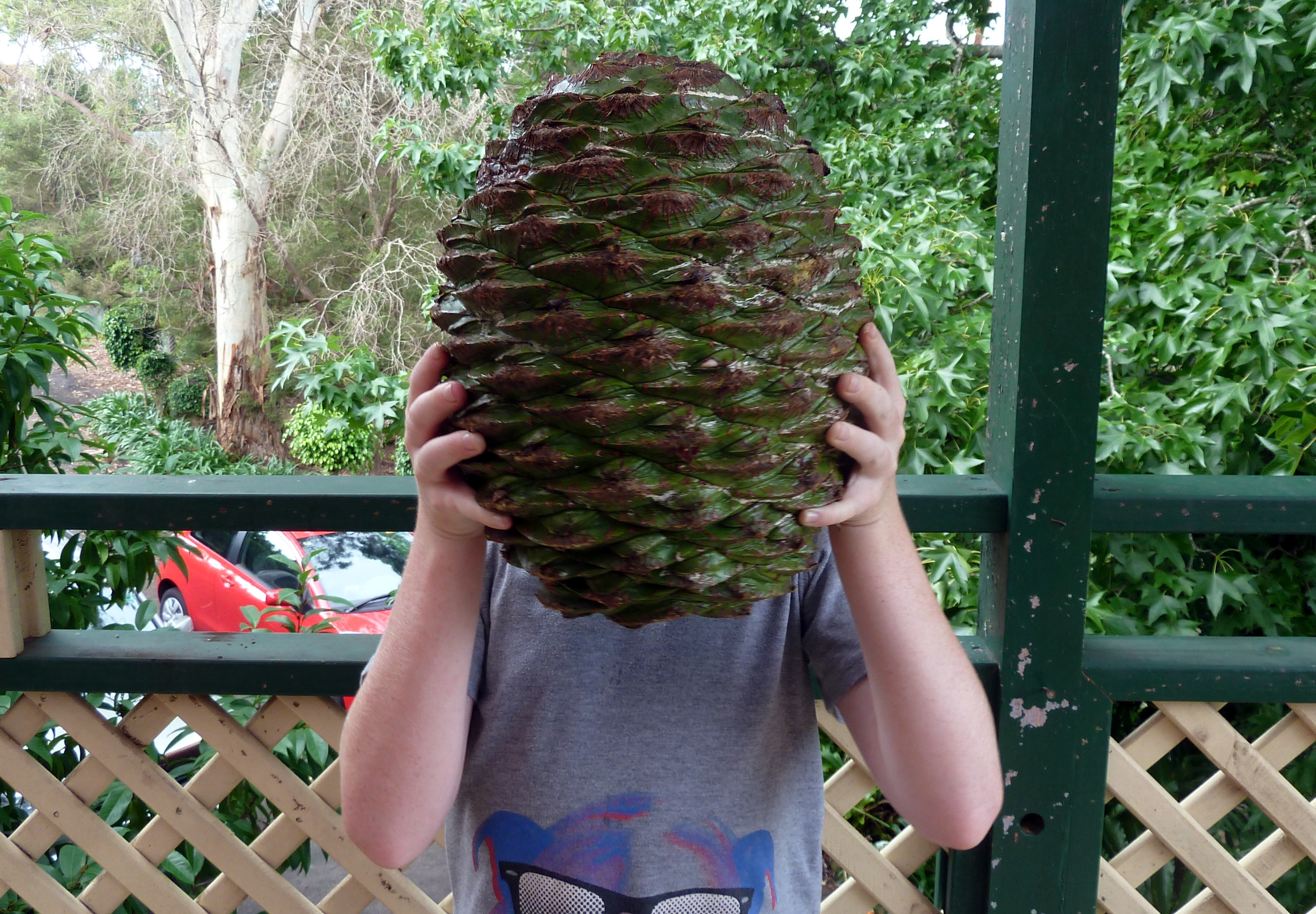
A comparison showing how large the cones can grow

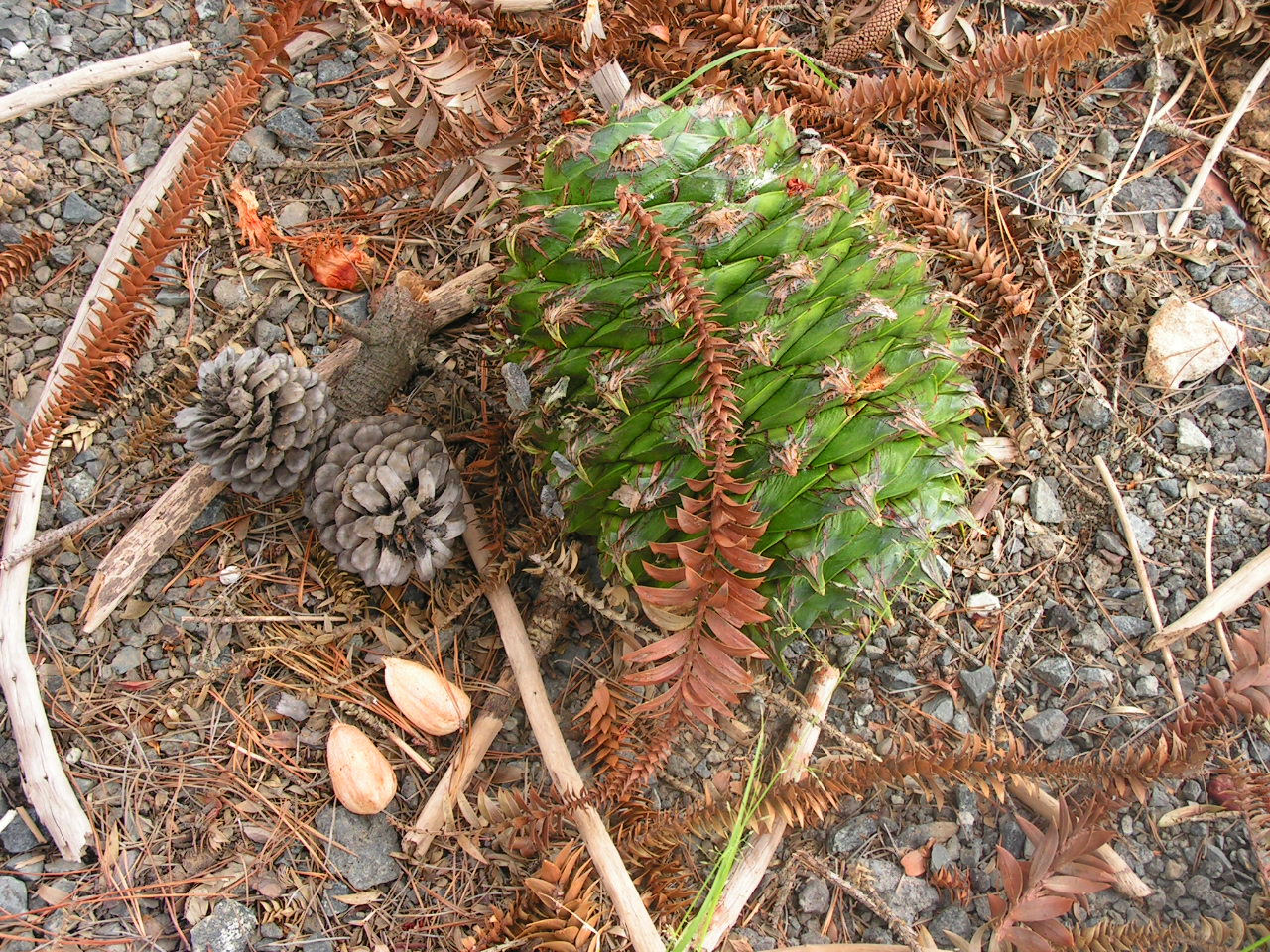
Whole cone and nuts

=== Bunya nut ===
Indigenous Australians eat the nut of the bunya tree (known as yenggi Aboriginal pronunciation: [jeŋgi]) both raw and cooked, and also in its immature form. Traditionally, the nuts were additionally ground and made into a paste, which was eaten directly or cooked in hot coals to make bread called manu. The nuts were also stored in the mud of running creeks, and eaten in a fermented state. This was considered a delicacy.

Apart from consuming the nuts, Indigenous Australians ate bunya shoots, and utilised the tree's bark as kindling.

Bunya nuts are still sold as a regular food item in grocery stalls and street-side stalls around rural southern Queensland. Some farmers in the Wide Bay/ Sunshine Coast regions have experimented with growing bunya trees commercially for their nuts and timber.

The bunya nut has become popularised as a 'bushfood' by indigenous foods enthusiasts. A huge variety of home-invented recipes now exists for the bunya nut; from pancakes, biscuits and breads, to casseroles, to 'bunya nut pesto' or hoummus. The nut is considered nutritious, with a unique flavour similar to starchy potato and chestnut.

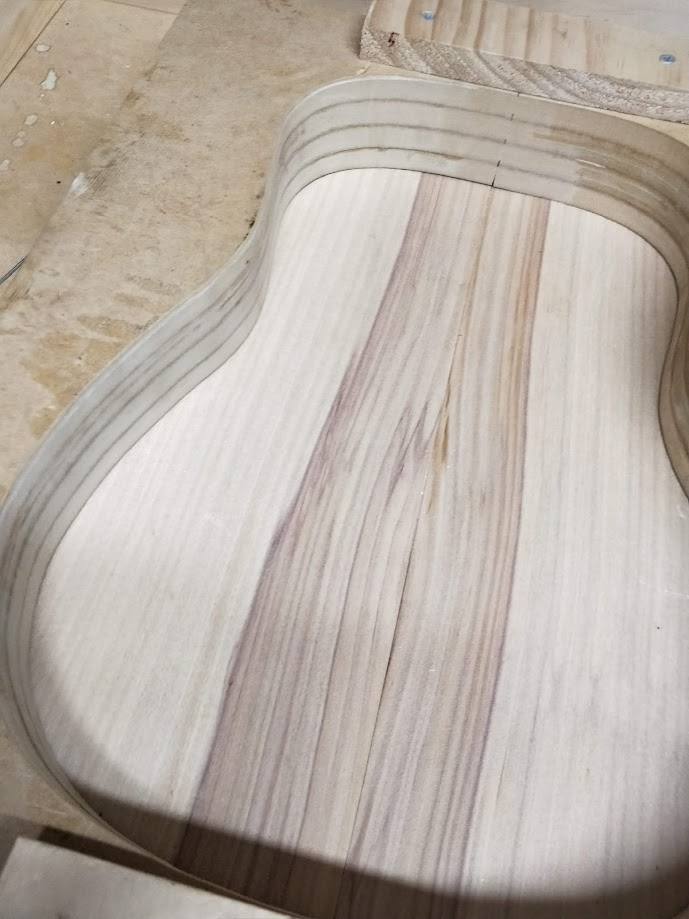
Bunya pine guitar body

When the nuts are boiled in water, the water turns red, making a flavoursome tea.

The nutritional content of the bunya nut is: 40% water, 40% complex carbohydrates, 9% protein, 2% fat, 0.2% potassium, 0.06% magnesium. It is also gluten free, making bunya nut flour a substitute for people with gluten intolerance.

The 1889 book The Useful Native Plants of Australia records that "The cones shed their seeds, which are two to two and a-half inches long by three-quarters of an inch broad; they are sweet before being perfectly ripe, and after that resemble roasted chestnuts in taste."

=== Timber ===
Bunya timber was and is still highly valued as "tonewood" for stringed instruments' sound boards since the first European settlers. Since the mid-1990s, the Australian company Maton has used bunya for the soundboards of its BG808CL Performer acoustic guitars. The Cole Clark company (also Australian) uses bunya for the majority of its acoustic guitar soundboards. The timber is valued by cabinet makers and woodworkers, and has been used for that purpose for over a century.

== Cultivation ==
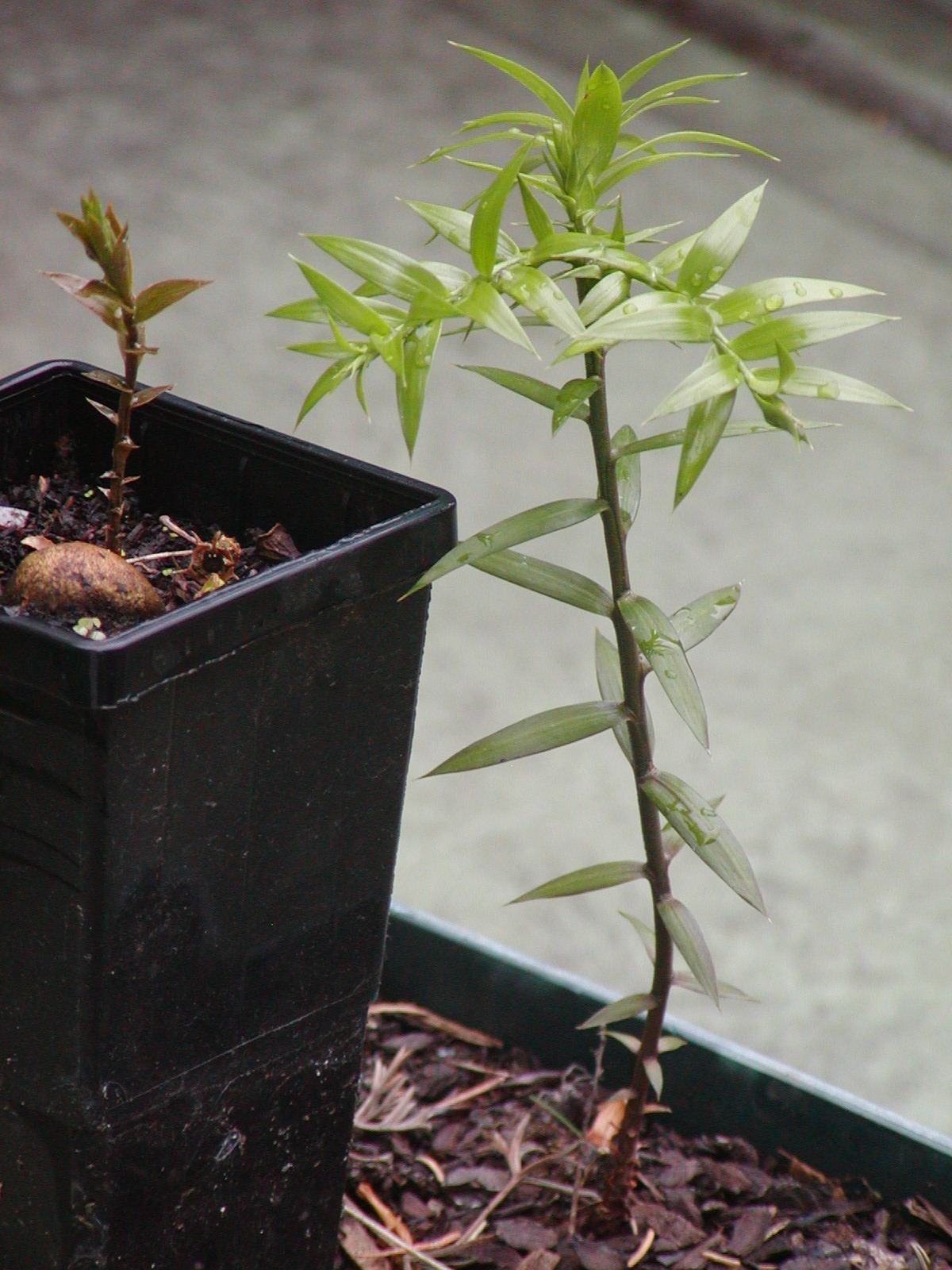
A pair of bunya seedlings showing the change in leaf colour. The cotyledons are hypogeal, remaining below the ground.

Bunya nuts are slow to germinate. A set of 12 seeds sown in Melbourne took an average of about six months to germinate (with the first germinating in three months) and only developed roots after one year. The first leaves form a rosette and are dark brown. The leaves only turn green once the first stem branch occurs. Unlike the mature leaves, the young leaves are relatively soft. As the leaves age they become very hard and sharp. Cuttings can be successful, though they must be taken from erect growing shoots, as cuttings from side shoots will not grow upright.

In the highly variable Australian climate, the varied timing of emergence of the seedlings maximises the possibility of at least successful replacement of the parent tree. A test of germination was carried out by Smith starting in 1999. Seeds were extracted from two mature cones collected from the same tree, a cultivated specimen at Petrie, just north of Brisbane (originally the homestead of Thomas Petrie, the son of the first European to report the species). One hundred apparently full seeds were selected and planted into 30 cm by 12 cm plastic tubes commercially filled with sterile potting mix in early February 1999. These were then placed in a shaded area and watered weekly. Four tubes were lost due to being knocked over. Of a total of 100 seeds placed, 87 germinated. The tubes were checked monthly for emergence over three years. Of these seeds, 55 emerged from April to December 1999; 32 emerged from January to September in 2000, one seed emerged in January 2001, and the last appeared in February 2001.

Once established, bunyas are quite hardy and they can be grown as far south as Hobart in Australia (42° S) and Christchurch in New Zealand (43° S) and (at least) as far north as Sacramento in California (38° N) and Coimbra (in the botanical garden) and even in Dublin area in Ireland (53ºN) in a microclimate protected from arctic winds and moderated by the Gulf Stream. They will reach a height of 35 to 40 metres, and live for about 500 years.

== Dangers ==
The cones of the bunya pine are some of the largest produced by the conifer family. The cones—which can grow to as much as 35 centimetres (14 in) in diameter when mature, and weigh up to 10 kilograms (22 lb)—can drop on unsuspecting passersby from heights of 40 metres (130 ft) or more. The falling cones are capable of causing severe injuries. Caution is also advised when parking under these trees as the falling cones can damage vehicles.

In 2015, a tourist in San Francisco suffered a severe brain injury after a 7 kilogram bunya cone fell from a tree, crushing his skull. The injuries sustained required multiple surgeries and led the man to sue the United States Government and several other federal agencies for $5 million for allegedly failing to post warnings about falling cones.

== In popular culture ==
A specimen of Araucaria bidwillii in East Los Angeles, California, is featured in Taylor Hackford's 1993 film Blood In Blood Out as a touchstone for the main characters. The tree, known as "El Pino" ("the pine" in Spanish), has become famous from this association, and is visited by international fans of the film. A late-2020 prank claiming the tree would be cut down incited a brief panic locally.

== Bibliography ==
- Haines R. J. (1983) Embryo development and anatomy in Araucaria Juss. Australian Journal of Botany. 31, 125–140.
- Haines R. J. (1983) Seed development in Araucaria Juss. Australian Journal of Botany. 31, 255–267.
- Hernandez-Castillo, G. R., Stockey R. A.(2002) Palaeobotany of the Bunya Pine In (Ed. Anna Haebich) ppl 31–38. 'On the Bunya Trail' Queensland Review – Special Edition, Volume 9, No. 2, November 2002 (University of Queensland Press: St Lucia).
- Petrie C. C. (ed) (1904), Tom Petrie's Reminiscences of Early Queensland (Brisb, 1904)
- Pye M.G., Gadek P. A. (2004) Genetic diversity, differentiation and conservation in Araucaria bidwillii (Araucariaceae), Australia's Bunya pine. Conservation Genetics. 5, 619–629.
- Smith I. R., Withers K., Billingsley J. (2007) Maintaining the Ancient Bunya Tree (Araucaria bidwillii Hook.) – Dispersal and Mast Years. 5th Southern Connection Conference, Adelaide, South Australia, 21–25 January 2007.
- Smith I. R. (2004) Regional Forest Types-Southern Coniferous Forests In 'Encyclopedia of Forest Sciences' (eds. Burley J., Evans J., Youngquist J.) Elsevier: Oxford. pp 1383–1391.
- Smith I. R., Butler D (2002) The Bunya in Queensland's Forests, In (Ed. Anna Haebich) pp. 31–38. 'On the Bunya Trail' Queensland Review – Special Edition, Volume 9, No. 2, November 2002 (University of Queensland Press: St Lucia).
