= Encino Oak Tree =

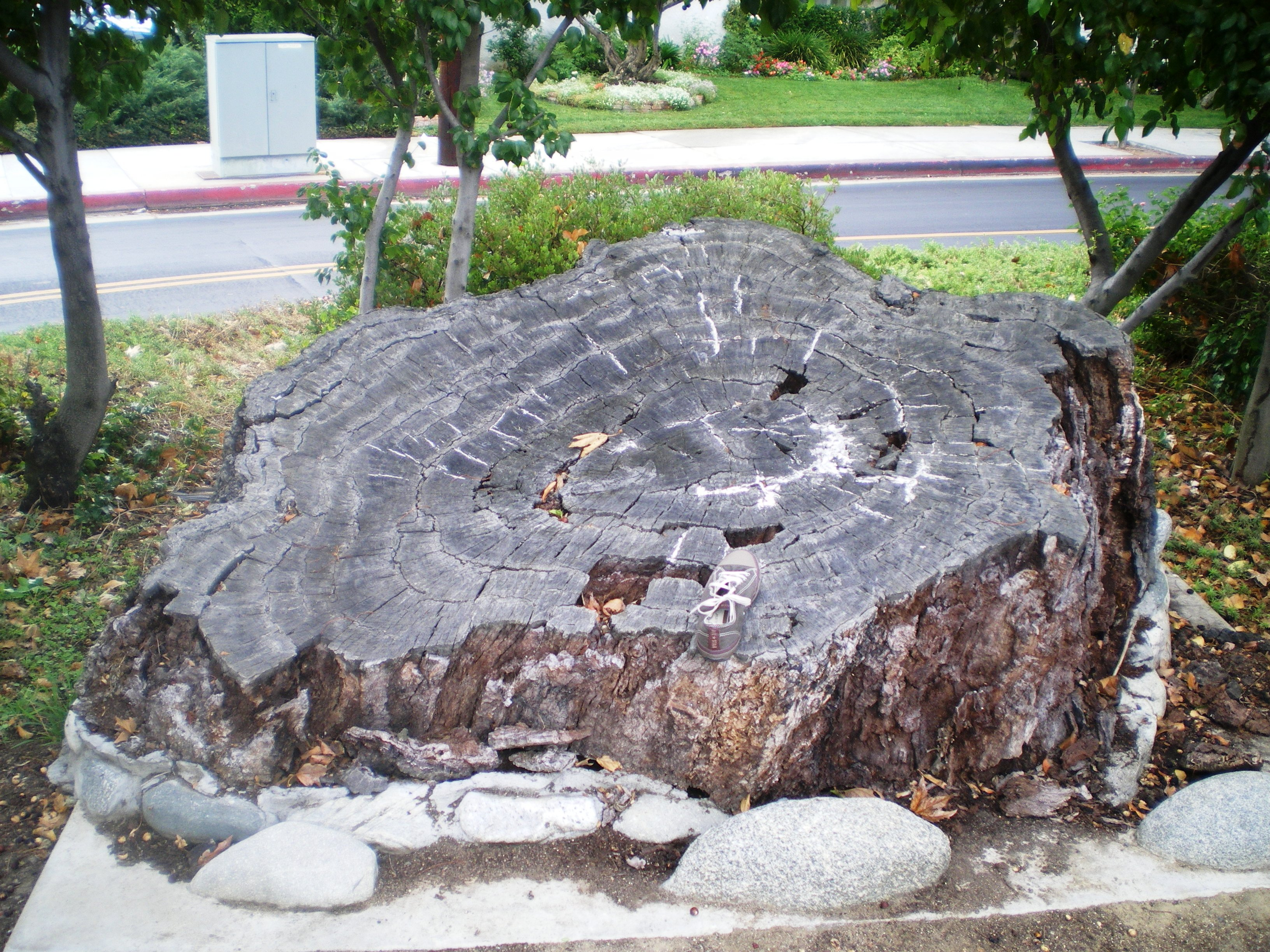
- Encino Oak Tree section

- Location within the Los Angeles metropolitan area
- 34.160249°N 118.509873°W
- Location: Louise Avenue, 210 feet south of Ventura Boulevard, Encino, Los Angeles, California

Site notes
- Governing body: City of Los Angeles

Los Angeles Historic-Cultural Monument
- Designated: September 6, 1963
- Reference no.: 24

The Encino Oak Tree, also known as the Lang Oak, was a 1,000-year-old California live oak tree, Quercus agrifolia, in the Encino section of Los Angeles, California. It was designated as a Los Angeles Historic-Cultural Monument (HCM #24) in 1963.

== Heritage ==
The Los Angeles Times once wrote of the Encino oak, "When the famed Lang oak tree of Encino was but a sapling, the Mayan Empire was crumbling and Vikings were sacking English sea towns." It was already 100 years old when Pope Urban II launched the first Crusade. And when the first Europeans passed through Encino in 1769 as part of the Portola Expedition, the tree was already more than 700 years old.

== Local landmark ==
As Encino was developed into a residential community in the mid-20th century, the Encino oak became recognized as a landmark, known for its size and longevity. It was recognized as "the oldest known tree in the city of Los Angeles". A California live oak tree is considered to be old at 300 years, and arborists considered the Encino tree's longevity to be extraordinary. One arborist noted, "It's just like standing next to a dinosaur."

TheCalifornia live oaks in the pre-urban Encino that the community was named after the Spanish word for "oak". The Encino oak is large that Louise Avenue was split to accommodate its enormous 150-foot (46 m) canopy, 8-foot (2.4 m) diameter, and 24-foot (7.3 m) circumference. It has been said that the Encino oak "creates a woodsy atmosphere more resembling a whole forest than just a single tree".

In 1958, the oak was threatened when a developer planned to bulldoze the tree to build a road. Local residents formed a group called Encino Save the Oaks, and the developer eventually donated the tree to the city. It was declared a Historic-Cultural Monument in 1963. In the years following its designation as a monument, the tree was a tourist attraction.

== Decline ==
By the 1990s, the tree was in a weakened condition. Some attributed its condition to the Encino Reservoir, built in 1921, for cutting off the natural water flow to the tree. Others blamed it on air pollution from traffic on nearby Ventura Boulevard. It also suffered from oak root fungus. In 1991, it was diagnosed with slime flux, a tree ailment caused by bacteria that generate fermentation inside the tree and send toxic sap oozing through the bark. Arborists reported that the tree desperately needed special care to save it. Arborists and city officials argued over the proper treatment for the ailing tree, with one arborist suggesting the city chisel small holes in the bark to release the toxic sap that was slowly killing the oak. Others suggested the drilling would put too much stress on the tree, which should be allowed to heal itself. Slime flux is not typically pathogenic or the most serious problem for this species, whereas oak root fungus will kill a coast live oak and is a reflection of cultivation problems. Since the area was heavily developed with a roadway constructed around the tree, root injuries, grade changes, and altered hydrology likely led to the oak root fungus issue and contributed significantly to the declining health.

Efforts to save the ailing oak became a publicized cause. In 1996, the Times reported on the oak: "His skin is mottled, some of his limbs are held together with pins, and his great, shaggy head hangs from its own weight. Old Lang is in trouble." In 1997, the Encino oak was honored at an Arbor Day ceremony attended by Wirt Morton, the great-great-grandson of National Arbor Day founder J. Sterling Morton, who on seeing the giant oak said, "I've never seen anything as phenomenal as that."

== Death ==
On February 7, 1998, an El Niño storm "delivered the death blow, felling the ailing tree with storm winds". As news of the tree's demise spread, onlookers gathered, some crying and taking branches as mementos. After decades of being threatened by development and pollution, one resident noted the irony that "now it goes because of nature". As souvenir-hunters sought to take pieces of the tree, police officers guarded it until its remains could be removed. One officer noted, "It got out of control. It's sad that we had to take two policemen off the street to watch a tree."

In the weeks following the tree's death, city officials debated what should be done with the tree's remains, leading the Times to ask, "How many bureaucrats, City Council aides, homeowners, urban planners and arborists does it take to decree the fate of a fallen king, the mighty oak of Ventura Boulevard?" Ultimately, the city opted to plant five new trees where the Encino oak had grown—three California sycamores and two coast live oaks. The city also unveiled an 8-by-6-foot (2.4 m × 1.8 m) oval slice of the tree in an April 1999 ribbon-cutting ceremony.

== See also ==
- Encino Springs
- List of individual trees
- List of Los Angeles Historic-Cultural Monuments in the San Fernando Valley
- El Pino - a historic and cultural landmark of East Los Angeles
