= El Pino (The Pine Tree) =

Bunya pine tree in East Los Angeles, California

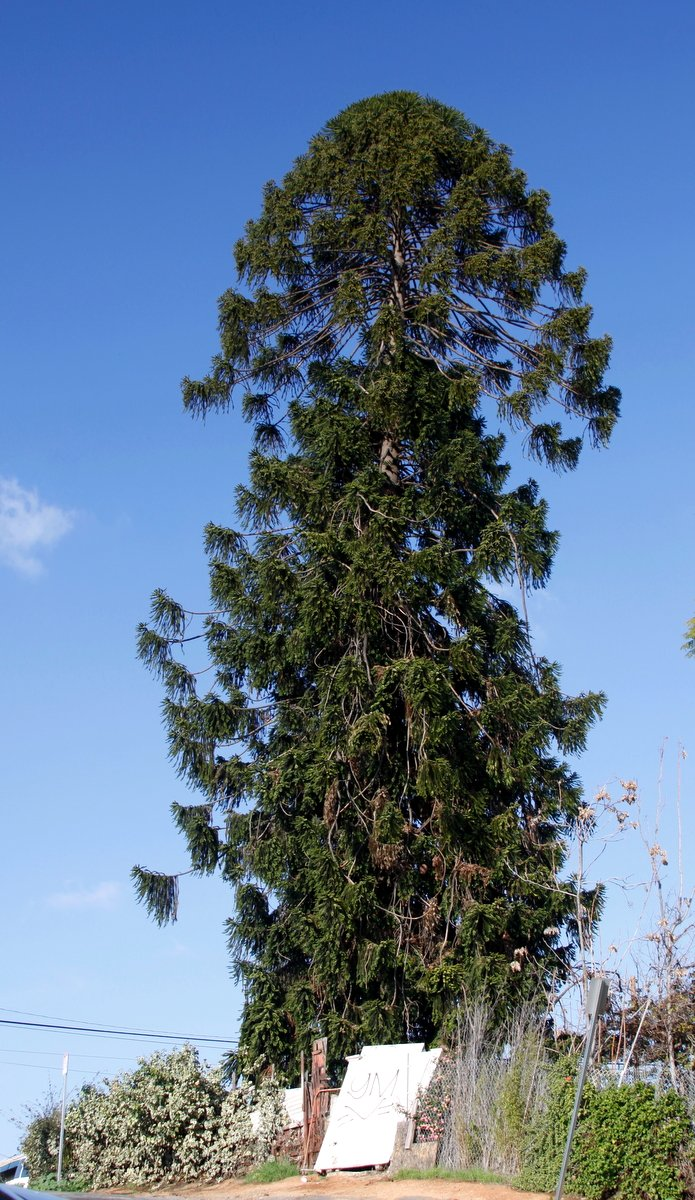
- El Pino

- Location within the Los Angeles metropolitan area Location within California
- Species: Araucaria bidwillii (Bunya pine)
- Location: East Los Angeles, California
- Coordinates: 34°02′36″N 118°11′33″W
- Date seeded: Unknown
- Custodian: Art Gastelum

El Pino (English: The Pine Tree) is a large bunya pine, a type of pine tree native to Australia, located on the southeastern corner of Folsom Street and N. Indiana Street in East Los Angeles, California. The tree overlooks the Wellington Heights neighborhood of East Los Angeles and the Boyle Heights neighborhood of the city of Los Angeles from atop a small hill.

== History ==
The tree, a mature bunya pine, grows on the former property of Dr. Okuno, a Japanese dentist and intern in a World War II concentration camp. Following release, Dr. Okuno received the land as a gift from an Anglo lady with whom his wife worked. There he rebuilt his business and amassed a huge library. After retiring, he took long strolls around East Los Angeles, greeting everyone and amusing the children with storytelling. Dr. Okuno is listed in the California Who's Who.

On Día de los Inocentes in December 2020, an online rumor spread that a real estate developer was planning to fell the tree as part of a new housing development. Although the rumour was false, it sparked outrage among the locals enough for them to petition the city to "save El Pino from being cut down". Art Gastelum, a local resident who owns the property on which the tree stands, reassured locals that he has no intentions to develop the property.

== East Los Angeles landmark ==
The people of East Los Angeles consider the tree a living monument of the area's multifaceted ethnic background. The area is known for having the highest proportion of Hispanic Americans out of any city or census-designated place in the United States outside of Puerto Rico.

In recent years, the tree has also become a symbol of community resistance to the gentrification of their neighborhood.

== In popular culture ==
El Pino is extensively featured in the 1993 Taylor Hackford movie Blood In Blood Out.

== See also ==
- Encino Oak Tree
- Old Survivor
