= Bunya Mountains National Park =

National park in Queensland, Australia

- IUCN category II (national park)
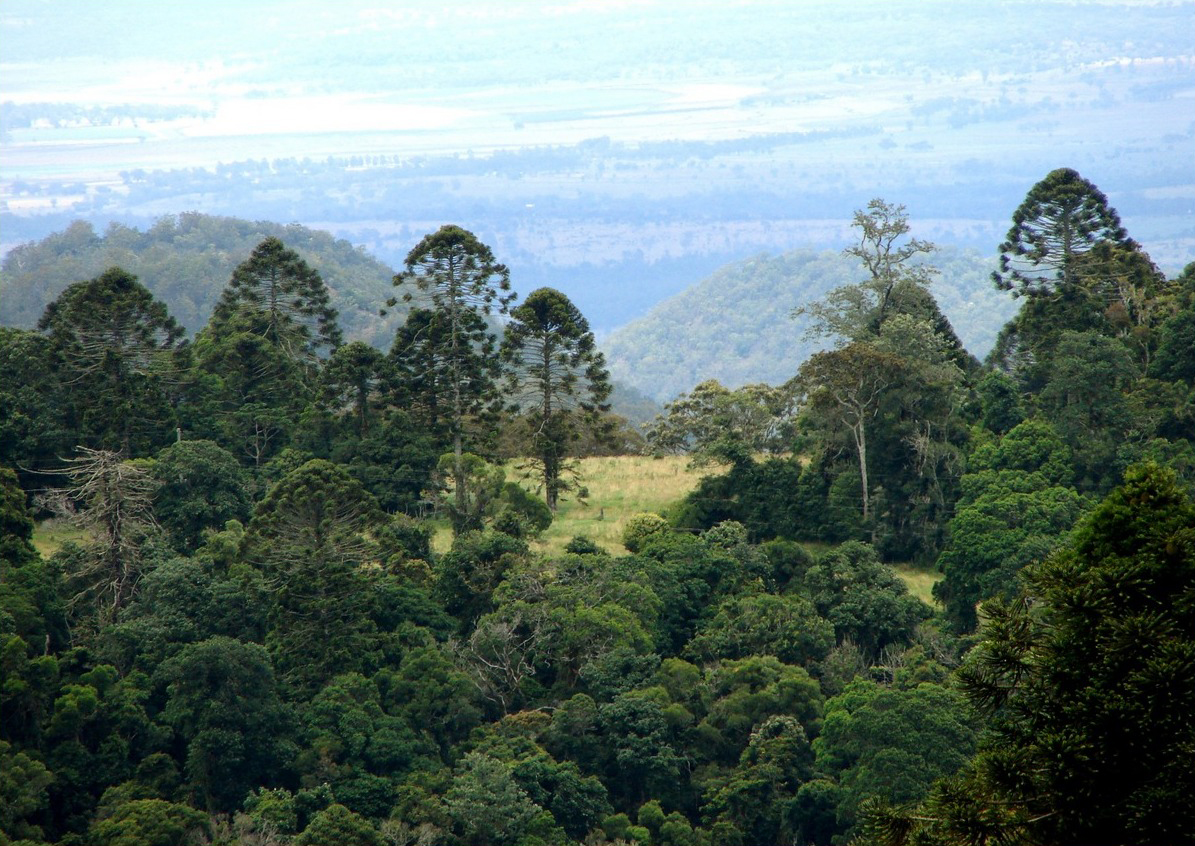
- Bunya pines

- Location within Queensland
- Location: Queensland
- Nearest city: Bell, Queensland
- Coordinates: 26°47′58″S 151°32′13″E
- Area: 117 km^{2} (45 sq mi)
- Established: 1908
- Governing body: Queensland Parks and Wildlife Service
- Website: http://www.nprsr.qld.gov.au/parks/bunya-mountains/index.html

Bunya Mountains is a national park in the South Burnett Region and Toowoomba Region in Queensland, Australia. The Bunya Mountains held a unique significance as the largest pan-tribal gathering place in eastern Australia, making them one of the most important cultural landscapes on the continent alongside Uluru.

== Geography ==
The park includes much of the mountain range called the Bunya Mountains. The park encompasses the most westerly area of subtropical rainforest in southern Queensland and the largest population of bunya pines remaining in the world. It is situated 63 km northeast of Dalby or 58 km southwest of Kingaroy.

The park is known for its abundant wildlife, permanent waterfalls and its views. The mild climate of the range means morning and evening temperatures are low. The park is accessed by a steep and winding roads and is serviced with camping grounds, a network of walking tracks and several picnic grounds.

== History ==
The Wakka Wakka, Jarowair and Barrumgum tribes are the traditional owners of the Bunya Mountains and have inhabited and managed the mountains through traditional land-use management for thousands of years which included the cultural significant "Bunya Feasts" which would see thousands of people from surrounding tribes from Queensland and New South Wales come to the Bunya Mountains for these gatherings. The Bunya grasslands are unique relics of a much cooler climate and have existed since the last ice age, persisting due to regular burning by Aboriginal peoples over many thousands of years known as "fire farming". Recent core samples confirmed that Indigenous fire management was occurring on the Bunya Mountains as far back as 9,000 years ago during the Holocene era. Evidence suggests fire farming created the largest estate management in the world of the vast state and territories of Australia, performed in ceremonies, for land control, food control and farming, and produce (native yams) harvesting by Aboriginal people for thousands of years. Fire management has enabled the grasslands to maintain their treeless characteristic, preventing rainforest and woodland species from becoming established. The balds are considered a cultural landscape and an enduring symbol of Indigenous land management which still hold significance to Indigenous people today.

The arrival of European settlers saw the removal of Indigenous communities off the Bunya Mountains ending active fire management by Indigenous people from 1860s onwards.

During the 1860s the park was logged for red cedar, bunya pine and hoop pine and the Aboriginal people were pushed out. European settlers began to visit the area and enjoy the scenery in the same decade.

The Bunya Sawmill opened in 1883. As the 9,112 ha (22,520-acre) national park was declared in 1908, it makes it the second oldest national park in Queensland. A further addition to the park was donated by WA Russell MLA in 1927. Timber was still removed from the national park until about 1917. The last sawmill on the mountains closed in 1945.

The first walking tracks were constructed in 1939. Carbine's chute was the first of many trenches built to assist the removal of logs off the mountains. It can be accessed by a 1.5 km track from Munros camp. The last sawmill in the area was at Wengenville, which closed in 1961. In a successful attempt to reduce the splintering and damage to logs from falling down the steep trenches the owner of the Wengenville sawmill, Lars Anderson, used a combination of tramway, winches, winders and flying foxes to transport logs.

== Flora ==
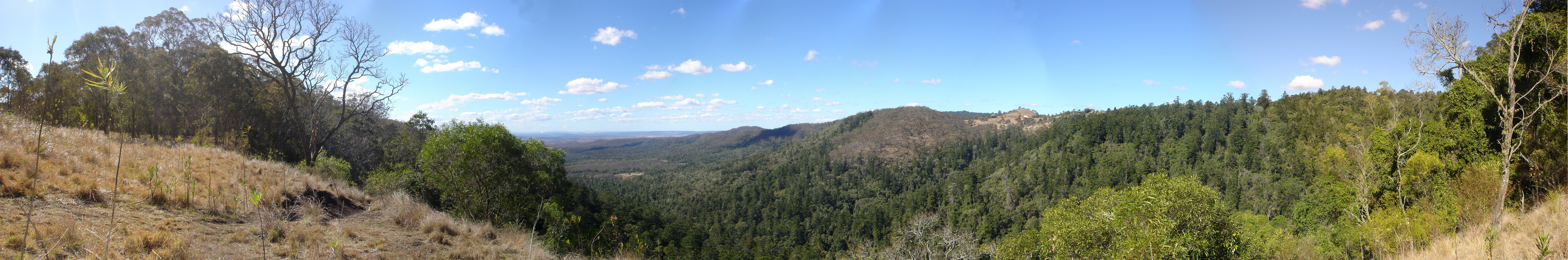
Looking north-east from Bunya Mountains over South Burnett and Kingaroy regions.

Some of the parks bunya pines are estimated to be up to 600 years old and 25 metres high. The forests contain stinging nettles, wild raspberry, many vines and pockets of ferns. Other trees species in the park include white beech and silky oaks. Grass trees on Mount Kiangarow grow nearly 5 m tall and some are least several hundred years old.

Scattered throughout the mountain forests are many natural clearings known as 'grassy balds'. These clearings are typically a few hectares in area and are caused by bushfires and geological conditions. Where there a slabs of unfractured basalt soil formation and root penetration is impossible, leaving a patch in the forest. There are about 100 balds, although those caused by fire are steadily being lost due to a lack of recent fires. The grassy balds have a higher biodiversity than the dense rainforests, because they are home to birds and rodents not found elsewhere in the forest.

== Fauna ==
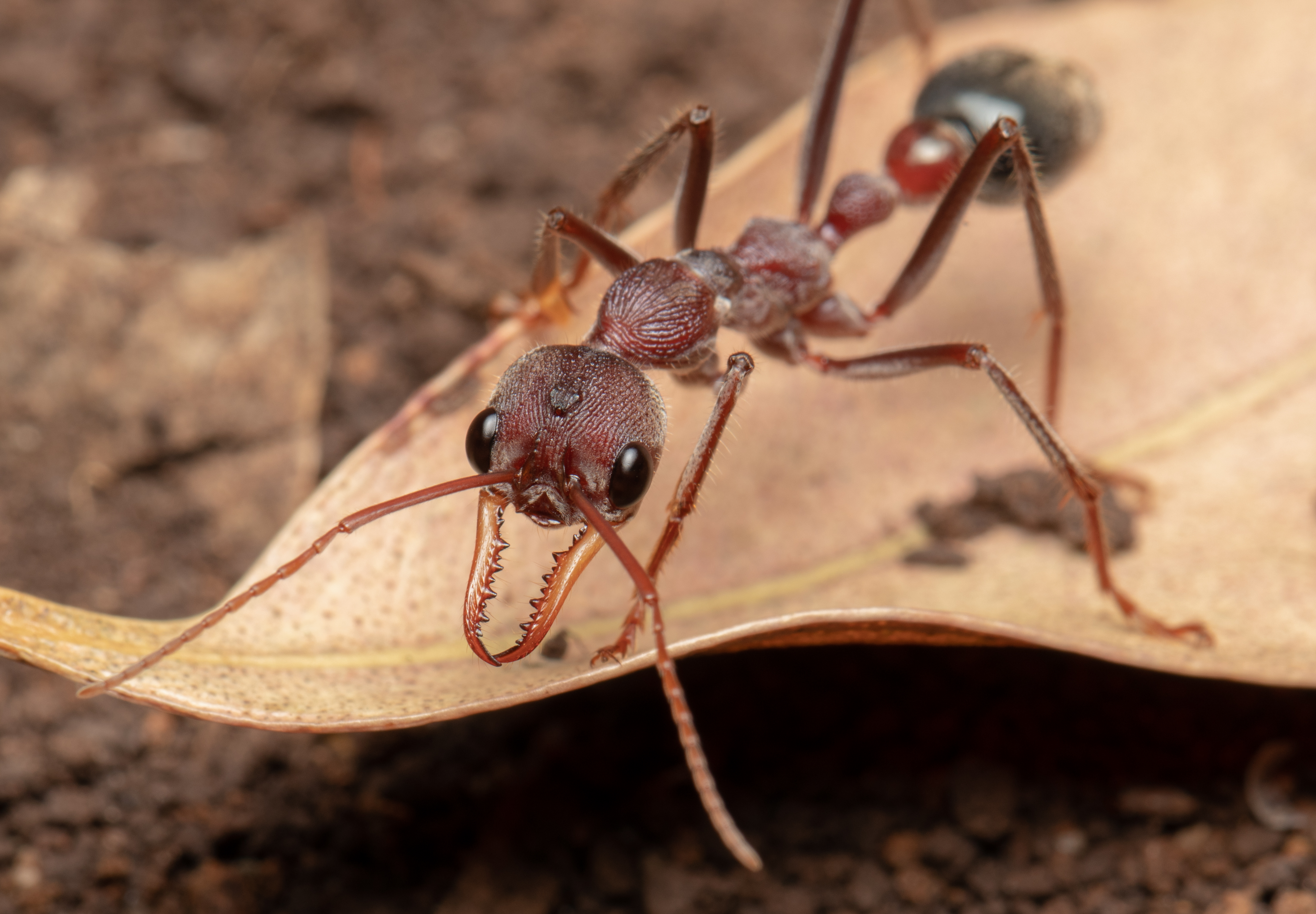
A myrmecia flavicoma in the park

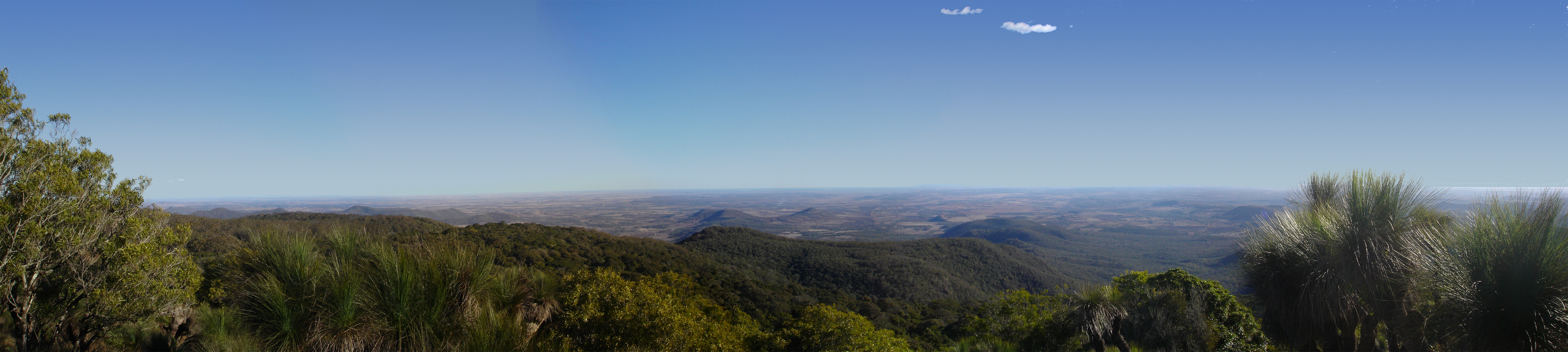
Looking south-east from Mount Kiangarow in the Bunya Mountains over the Darling Downs

The park is home to more than 200 frogs and reptiles as well as marsupials such as pademelons, rock wallabies, swamp wallabies and an endemic subspecies of ringtail possum found only on the mountain peaks. Reptile species include the blue-tongued skink, land mullet, carpet snake, red bellied black snake and brown tree snake.

The mountains are part of the Bunya Mountains and Yarraman Important Bird Area which contains what is thought to be the largest population of the black-breasted button-quail. In the park, 120 species of bird have been recorded. Significant species include the wedge-tailed eagle, peregrine falcon, grey goshawk, brown cuckoo-dove, rose robin, eastern yellow robin, large-billed gerygone, and Australian golden whistler. The Bunya Mountains support the most westerly populations of many rainforest dwelling species, including green catbirds, regent bowerbirds, paradise riflebirds, eastern whipbirds, noisy pittas and the Australian logrunner. Some of the more commonly seen species include pied currawongs, laughing kookaburras, Australian king parrots, crimson rosellas, sulphur-crested cockatoos, red-browed finches, white-browed scrubwrens, satin bowerbirds, wonga pigeons and brush turkeys.

== Waterfalls ==
The park contains a number of waterfalls including Tim Shea Falls and Mcgrory Falls.

== Management ==
The national park is currently managed by the Department of the Environment, Tourism, Science and Innovation, There has been an integrated program of burning the unique grassland balds by the Queensland Parks and Wildlife Service in the Bunya Mountains since the late 1990s with 27% of unburnt balds being burnt for the first time in many years. There have been difficulties in recovering a number of balds which have well established forest canopies due to decades of non-burning, these balds may be too far gone to recover. Some balds which have had significant forest species invasion have had mechanical removal and coppicing of trees to aid recovery of the balds through burning. Proactive fire management is a priority within the current management plan for the Bunya Mountains National Park with additional importance given to partnerships with traditional owners using traditional fire techniques in restoring and maintaining the grasslands. Australian Government initiatives such as the ‘Working on Country’ Program has been active on the mountain since 2009 allowing greater conservation action through additional rangers and resources being used to enable recovery of this unique threatened grassland landscape.

== Facilities ==
There is a visitor information centre and campgrounds at Dandabah. Other campgrounds are provided at Burton's Well and Westcott. There are a number of well-developed walking tracks, some with lookouts. Picnic facilities are provided at all campgrounds, as well as Cherry Plain.

== Access ==
Roads from Toowoomba, Kingaroy, Dalby and Nanango all lead up the mountains. Steep grades mean travelling with caravans and trailers is not recommended. Smaller caravans can access the mountains via Maidenwell.

== See also ==
- Protected areas of Queensland
- List of tramways in Queensland
