= Jarowair =

Indigenous group of Queensland, Australia

The Jarowair are an indigenous Australian people of the Darling Downs area of Queensland.

== Country ==
Norman Tindale estimated Jarowair traditional lands to have encompassed approximately 1,000 square miles (2,600 km^{2}). They were concentrated from the western slopes of the Great Dividing Range around Crows Nest to Dalby. Their northern confines were at Bell in the Bunya Mountains, while their southern flank ended at around Oakey.

== Gummingurru ceremonial site ==
The Jarowair maintained an important ceremonial site, near the present-day township of Gowrie Junction, north of Toowoomba and 50 km from the Bunya Mountains. It was on one of the major routes employed by many Aboriginal tribes to the south and southeast to participate in the triennial bunya nut feast.

Gummingurru extends over 5 1/2 hectares and the site and surrounding land was taken over by the first settler in the area, Alfred Walker, in 1871. Ben Gilbert, the great grandson of early settlers to the district, James Benjamin Jinks and Hephzibah Jinks, purchased the property in 1948 and reported the existence of the monumental configuration of assembled stones on the property to the Queensland Museum in 1960. The Jarowair regard Gilbert as an authority as he was regarded as a classificatory brother to several Aboriginal men from the Waka Waka Nation. One of these men was Harold Bunda Darlow who belonged to the Burunggam tribe near Jimbour. Uncle Harold had worked for Joshua Bell at Jimbour Station. In his later years he lived with his relative Mrs. Phyllis Hall in Toowoomba and it was in this time that he entrusted Ben Gilbert with traditional lore regarding what turned out to be Queensland's major sacred Bora ceremonial ground. Another Aboriginal elder, Gaiarbau, also known as Willie Mackenzie, who was a Waka Waka man from the Bunya Mountains region, initiated Ben Gilbert into the tribe and gave him the tribal name of Banda. The site was painstakingly mapped in 1960 by the Queensland Museum under the supervision of Dr. Alan Bartholomai and Kay and Stanley Breedon.

The structure of circles includes several totemic designs, of a turtle (or tortoise), an imposing figure of a carpet snake and an emu, and a bunya nut orientated towards the mountains from where the Aborigines would gather it. On 9 December 2000, the QLD Attorney General and Minister for Justice and the Arts, Matt Foley, handed over the deed of grant to the traditional owners representing the Waka Waka, Warra and Jarowair people. The site is now administered by the Gumminguru Land Trust.

== History ==
The Jarowair were rapidly dispossessed of their lands in the wake of the large colonial push to take over their territory for pastoral stations in the early 1840s. By the early 20th century the Queensland government relocated the Jarowair to Cherbourg. As late as the 1950s most of them were forcibly removed offshore to Fraser Island, and Palm Island.

== Alternative names ==
- Yarrowair, Yarow-wair, Yarrow Wair

== Sources ==
- Evans, Raymond (2007). A History of Queensland. Cambridge University Press. ISBN 9780521876926.
- Jones, Janice K.; Moodie, Donna; Hobson, Nicola (2014). "Dinawan Dreeaming:Seeing the Darnmess of the Stars". In Jones, Janice K. (ed.). Weaving Words: Personal and Professional Transformation through Writing as Research. Cambridge Scholars Publishing. pp. 81–101. ISBN 978-1-443-86280-6.
- Ross, Anne (March 2008). "Managing Meaning at an Ancient Site in the 21st Century: The Gummingurru AboriginalStone Arrangement on the Darling Downs, Southern Queensland". Oceania. 78 (1): 91–108. doi:10.1002/j.1834-4461.2008.tb00030.x. JSTOR 40495553.
- Tindale, Norman Barnett (1974). "Jarowair (QLD)". Aboriginal Tribes of Australia: Their Terrain, Environmental Controls, Distribution, Limits, and Proper Names. Australian National University Press. Archived from the original on 21 March 2018.
