= Bunya Mountains =

Mountain range in Queensland, Australia

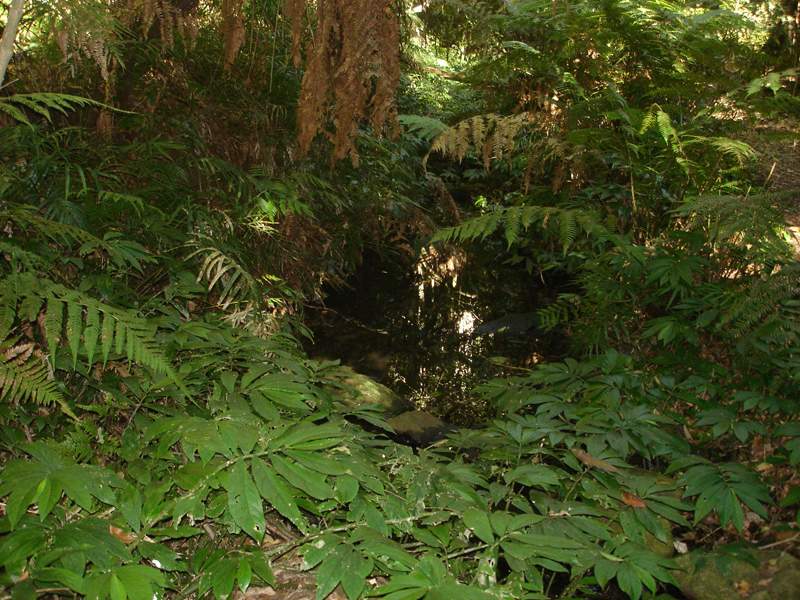
- A small creek in the national park

Highest point
- Peak: Mount Kiangarow
- Elevation: 1,135 m (3,724 ft)

Geography
- Location within Queensland
- Country: Australia
- State: Queensland
- Range coordinates: 26°50′S 151°33′E

Geology
- Rock age: Jurassic
- Rock type: Shield Volcano

The Bunya Mountains are a distinctive set of peaks forming an isolated section of the Great Dividing Range in southern Queensland. The mountain range forms the northern edge of the Darling Downs in the locality also called Bunya Mountains near Bell and Dalby. The mountains are south of Kingaroy and just to the south west of Nanango. The range is the remains of a shield volcano which was built from numerous basalt lava flows about 23–24 million years ago.

In 2009 as part of the Q150 celebrations, the Bunya Mountains was announced as one of the Q150 Icons of Queensland for its role as a "Natural attraction". The Bunya Mountains hold a unique significance as the largest pan-tribal gathering place in eastern Australia, making them one of the most important cultural landscapes on the continent alongside Uluru.

== Landforms ==
The range rises to an average elevation of 975 m; however the two tallest mountains on the range, Mount Kiangarow and Mount Mowbullan, rise to over 1,100 m. Slopes facing the north east are part of the Burnett River catchment, those on the south east make up part of the Brisbane River catchment, while those facing the south west belong to the Condamine River catchment and ultimately the Murray-Darling River system.

== Vegetation ==
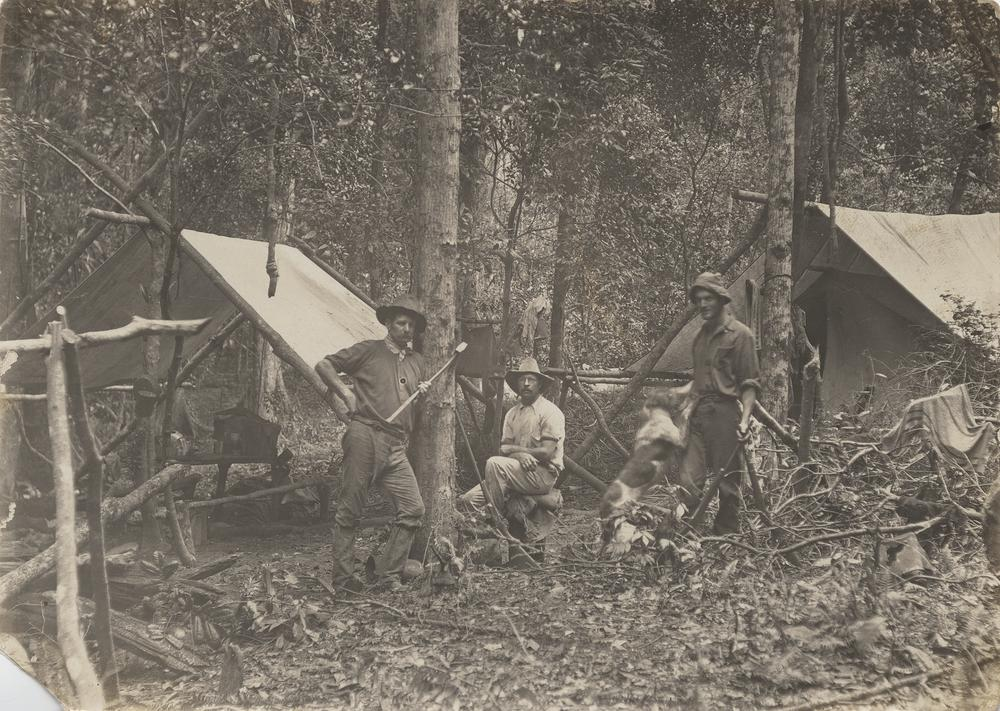
Loggers at their camp in the Bunya Mountains, 1912

The mountains are covered with ancient conifer rainforest that co-exists with a number of other unique natural features - 'balds' which are open grasslands including some that contain rare grass species, vine, and sclerophyll forests.

Parts of the forest were once logged for various timbers including red cedar, bunya pine and hoop pine. However, most of the peaks are completely uncleared and covered in forest as the range was too steep for early timber clearers. The mountains are home to the largest natural bunya pine forest in the world.

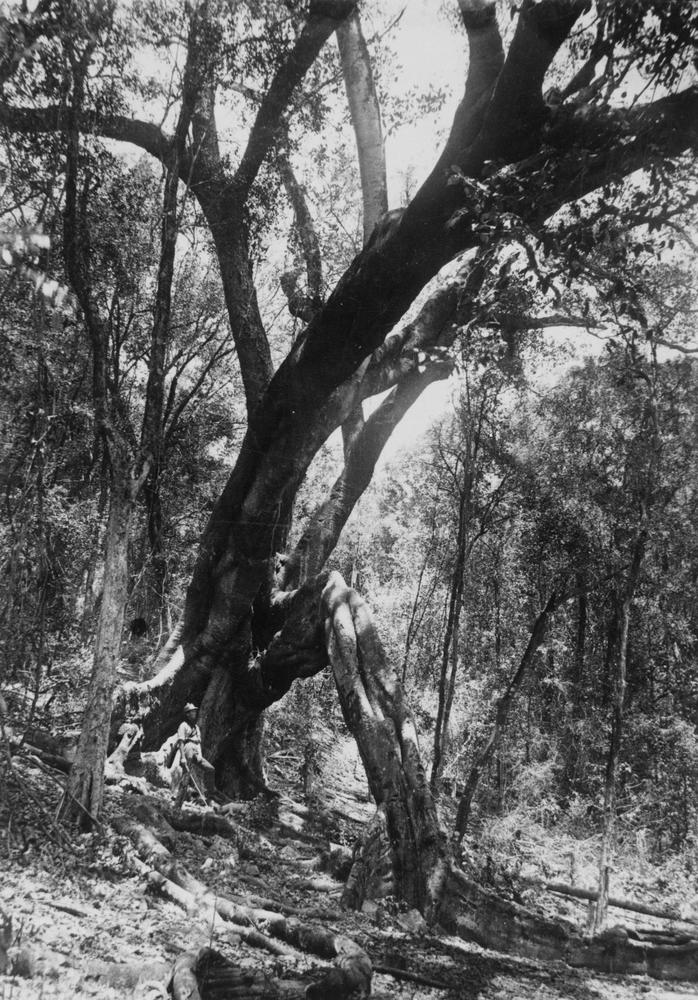
Rainforest trees in the Bunya Mountains, 1913. John Oxley Library.

== Indigenous significance ==
The Bunya Mountains and neighbouring areas were the focus of major gatherings of Indigenous Australians from South East and Central Queensland to north east New South Wales. The gatherings occurred during the seasons when the bountiful nuts of the bunya pine ripened, from December through to March, and especially during 'bumper crops' which appeared to occur about every three or four years. These were evidently the largest and widest-attended Indigenous gatherings in Australia. Climbers would use a strong vine around their waist and the tree, which can be up to 1.5 m in width and up to 50 m tall, to reach the nuts. Members of the guest tribes were not allowed to climb or collect nuts from the tree. Apart from feasting on bunya nuts, participants engaged in a variety of intertribal activities: games and sports, ceremony, trade, knowledge exchange, the arrangement of marriages and the settling of disputes. 1902 was the final known gathering on the range.

Indigenous groups such as the Wakka Wakka, Githabul, Kabi Kabi, Jarowair, Gooreng Gooreng, Butchella, Quandamooka, Barrangum, Yiman and Willi Willi traditional owners have continued cultural and spiritual connections to the Bunya Mountains to this day, a number of strategies including the use of traditional ecological knowledge have been incorporated into the current management practices of the national park and conservation reserves with the Bunya Murri Ranger project currently operating in the mountains.

== Tourism ==
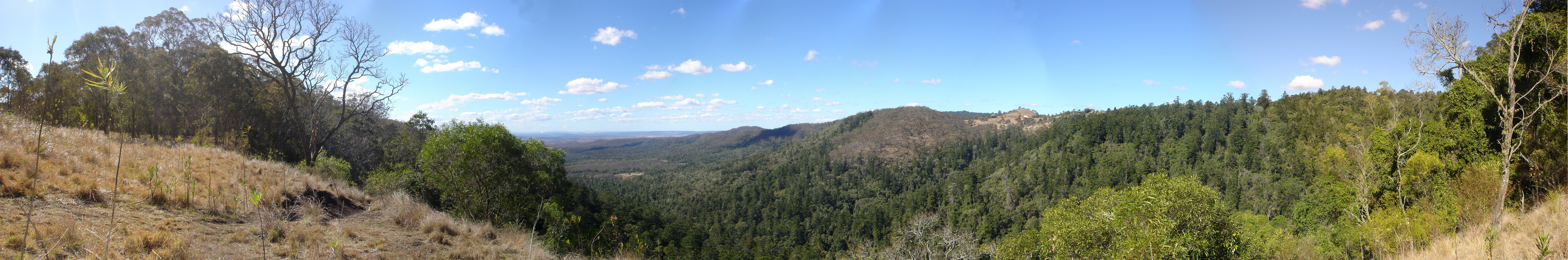
Looking north-east from Bunya Mountains over Lower Burnett and Kingaroy regions.

Much of the area is protected as the Bunya Mountains National Park, the state's second oldest National Park, being established in 1908. There are many picnic spots, walking tracks, lookouts and a few camping grounds on the range, as well as a variety of cottage and group accommodation facilities for families, friends, and school camp groups. Along the walking tracks, which lead to lookouts that offer views of the surrounding countryside, flora such as ferns and staghorns, as well as the unique bunya pine, can be seen. Waterfalls add to the scenic beauty.

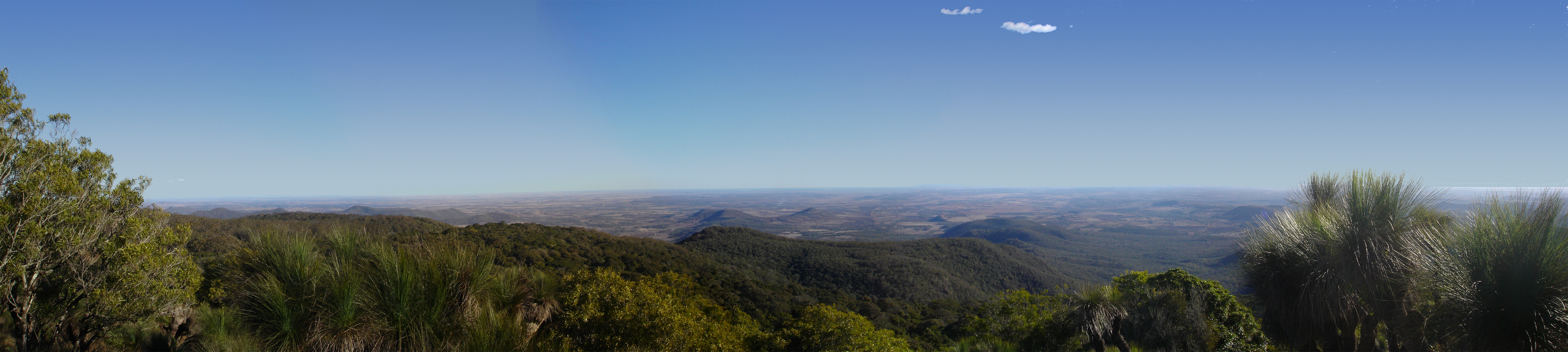
Looking south-west from Mount Kiangarow over the Darling Downs.

In the small patches of cleared land that are used by tourists, colourful birds such as Australian king parrots and rosellas can be seen. Fauna such as wallabies, scrub turkeys, koalas, echidnas and possums may be seen. The unique bunya pine is known for its nuts, which were a favoured food of local Aboriginal Australians. Established in 1969 on a former lucerne farm owned by Joe Walker near the Dandabah Day Use Area, the Bunya Mountains Tavern has operated under various names, evolving from a small vendor of fresh produce and confectionery into a hospitality venue serving local and international tourists.

== Climate ==
The mountains have a highland subtropical climate that is significantly cooler and wetter than the surrounding plains. Heavy winter frosts and even light snow occasionally occur on the highest peaks, while in summer, the mountains experience frequent heavy storms which contributes to the lush rainforest.

Climate data for Mount Mowbullan
Month	Jan	Feb	Mar	Apr	May	Jun	Jul	Aug	Sep	Oct	Nov	Dec	Year
Record high °C (°F)	38.3 (100.9)	37.7 (99.9)	31.8 (89.2)	27.4 (81.3)	24.1 (75.4)	20.7 (69.3)	19.9 (67.8)	24.2 (75.6)	30.0 (86.0)	31.8 (89.2)	34.0 (93.2)	36.7 (98.1)	38.3 (100.9)
Mean daily maximum °C (°F)	26.1 (79.0)	25.7 (78.3)	23.2 (73.8)	19.8 (67.6)	16.2 (61.2)	13.1 (55.6)	12.7 (54.9)	13.9 (57.0)	16.7 (62.1)	20.5 (68.9)	23.8 (74.8)	25.9 (78.6)	19.8 (67.6)
Mean daily minimum °C (°F)	12.5 (54.5)	12.3 (54.1)	10.0 (50.0)	7.8 (46.0)	3.7 (38.7)	1.9 (35.4)	0.8 (33.4)	1.2 (34.2)	4.0 (39.2)	7.6 (45.7)	9.5 (49.1)	11.0 (51.8)	6.8 (44.2)
Record low °C (°F)	4.8 (40.6)	3.9 (39.0)	1.2 (34.2)	−2.5 (27.5)	−4.6 (23.7)	−7.8 (18.0)	−9.0 (15.8)	−6.9 (19.6)	−6.2 (20.8)	−5.1 (22.8)	−2.6 (27.3)	3.6 (38.5)	−9.0 (15.8)
Average rainfall mm (inches)	142.9 (5.63)	125.3 (4.93)	77.5 (3.05)	63.9 (2.52)	73.3 (2.89)	49.8 (1.96)	59.1 (2.33)	43.0 (1.69)	51.0 (2.01)	84.1 (3.31)	100.2 (3.94)	140.5 (5.53)	1,010.6 (39.79)
Average rainy days (≥ 0.2mm)	13.9	13.3	13.5	10.3	9.8	9.2	8.0	7.1	7.0	8.9	9.9	12.5	123.4
Source: Bureau of Meteorology

== Roads ==
A group of roads provides access to the mountain community from various lowland localities. These roads ensure continuity of access in times of flooding or other natural disasters, and during planned maintenance activities.

== See also ==
- List of mountains in Australia
- List of volcanoes in Australia
