= Proston Weir =

Weir in Queensland, Australia

- Location of the weir in Queensland
- Interactive map of Proston Weir
- Country: Australia
- Location: Proston, Wide Bay-Burnett, Queensland
- Coordinates: 26°12′2.15″S 151°34′25.65″E
- Purpose: Irrigation; Water supply
- Status: Operational
- Construction began: 1965
- Opening date: c. 1966
- Owner: South Burnett Regional Council

Dam and spillways
- Type of dam: Barrage
- Impounds: Stuart River

Reservoir
- Total capacity: 307 ML (249 acre⋅ft); or; 370 ML (300 acre⋅ft)

The Proston Weir is a small weir located on Stuart River between the localities of Proston and Okeden in the South Burnett Region of Queensland, Australia. The weir is located 5 kilometres (3.1 mi) southwest of the town of Proston and downriver from the Gordonbrook Dam and upstream from the confluence with the Boyne River.

== Overview ==
Construction of the mass concrete gravity structure commenced in 1965 and concluded in c. 1966. The purpose of the weir was to supply water for agriculture including stock and limited irrigation. The weir incorporates a 1.5-metre-high (5 ft) water-inflated rubber dam for a moveable crest which automatically adjusts itself to permit flood flows to pass downriver without causing excessive increase in the water level and to minimise siltation in the storage. Estimates of the storage capacity range from 307 megalitres (249 acre⋅ft) to 370 megalitres (300 acre⋅ft).

=== Recreation ===
There are no picnic or toilet facilities adjacent to the weir. Recreational fishing is permitted, but no power boating is allowed. When the weir overflows the current becomes strong 200 metres (660 ft) upstream of the dam wall. As there aren't any safety barriers on the wall, swimming or kayaking on the weir after heavy rain is considered extremely dangerous.

== See also ==
- List of dams and reservoirs in Australia
- Inflatable rubber dam
