= Electoral district of Stanley =

Electoral district of Stanley may refer to:

- Electoral district of Stanley (Queensland), former district of the Legislative Assembly of Queensland, 1873 to 1950
- Electoral district of Stanley (South Australia), former district of the South Australian House of Assembly, 1862 to 1956
- Electoral district of County of Stanley, former district of the Legislative Council of New South Wales, 1851 to 1856
- Electoral district of Stanley County, former district of the Legislative Assembly of New South Wales, 1856 to 1859
