= Richard Jones (1786–1852) =

Australian merchant and pastoralist

Richard Jones (1786 – 6 November 1852) was an English-born businessman and politician in New South Wales and Queensland (then part of the Colony of New South Wales), Australia.

== Early life ==
Jones was born at Chirbury in Shropshire to Thomas Bowdler Jones, small landowner and brewer, and Elizabeth Ann (née) Philips. He was a clerk in London before migrating to New South Wales, arriving in August 1809. He became a successful merchant, pastoralist and was a major shipowner and significant whaler in Sydney. Fifteen of his vessels made 67 whaling voyages from Port Jackson between 1819 and 1843.

In 1823 he married Mary Louisa Peterson, with whom he had eight children.

== Politics ==
On 30 January 1829, Jones was an appointed member of the New South Wales Legislative Council, a role he held until 5 January 1843. In 1832, the Council changed from a fully appointed body to become a body of 36 members with 12 appointed and 24 elected. From 17 July 1843 Jones continued as an appointed member of the Council. However, even as he appointed, his mercantile business was suffering in the economic downturn that prevailed from 1842 to 1844. In August 1843, he was unable to pay debts of £180,000 and he became insolvent in October 1843, forcing him to resign from the Council, effective 1 November 1843. Barrister Robert Lowe was appointed to the Council to replace him.

Having moved to Brisbane (then part of New South Wales but later in Queensland), on 1 October 1850 Jones was elected as a member of the New South Wales Legislative Council representing the electoral district of Counties of Gloucester, Macquarie, and Stanley (Brisbane being within the County of Stanley). He held the position until 30 June 1851, when the electorate was split into three separate electorates. He was then elected on 1 September 1851 to the Council as the member for the new electoral district of Stanley Boroughs, which included North Brisbane (the settled areas north of the Brisbane River), South Brisbane, Kangaroo Point and Ipswich. He held that position until his death on 6 November 1852.

== Later life ==
While in Sydney where the Legislative Council met, Jones had a paralytic fit. He returned to his home in New Farm, where he died on Saturday 6 November 1852. On Sunday 7 November 1852, his body was taken by boat to Brisbane where was buried in the North Brisbane Burial Ground with Church of England rites conducted by Reverend H.O. Irwin from St John's. It was estimated that 300 to 400 people attended the burial

== Legacy ==
One of his sons, also called Richard was appointed as a member of the Legislative Council in 1899 until his death in 1909.

New South Wales Legislative Council
Unknown	Appointed member Jan 1829 – Jan 1843	Council re-constituted
New Council	Appointed member Jul – Nov 1843	Succeeded by Robert Lowe
Preceded by Kenneth Snodgrass	Member for Counties of Gloucester, Macquarie, and Stanley; Oct 1850 – Jun 1851	replaced by districts of Gloucester & Macquarie, Stanley & Stanley Boroughs
New district district above divided in three	Member for Stanley Boroughs; Sep 1851 – Nov 1852	Succeeded by Henry Russell
