= Electoral district of Stanley Boroughs (NSW Legislative Council) =

Former legislative council electoral district of New South Wales, Australia

Stanley Boroughs New South Wales—Legislative Council
- State: New South Wales
- Created: 1851
- Abolished: 1856
- Namesake: County of Stanley
- Coordinates: 27°30′S 153°00′E

The Electoral district of Stanley Boroughs was an electorate of the New South Wales Legislative Council at a time when some of its members were elected and the balance were appointed by the Governor. It was a new electorate created in 1851 by the expansion of the Legislative Council to 54 members, with 18 to be appointed and 36 elected. The previous district of Counties of Gloucester, Macquarie, and Stanley was split into the districts of Gloucester & Macquarie, Stanley and Stanley Boroughs. The district included North Brisbane, South Brisbane, Kangaroo Point and Ipswich.

In 1856 the unicameral Legislative Council was abolished and replaced with an elected Legislative Assembly and an appointed Legislative Council. The district was represented by the Legislative Assembly electorate of Stanley Boroughs.

== Members ==
Member	Term
Richard Jones	Sep 1851 – Nov 1852
Henry Russell	Jan 1853 – Aug 1855
John Richardson	Sep 1855 – Feb 1856

John Richardson went on to represent Stanley Boroughs in the Legislative Assembly from 1856.

== Election results ==
=== 1851 ===
1851 New South Wales colonial election, 12 September: Stanley Boroughs
Candidate	Votes	%
Richard Jones	114	52.78
Henry Hughes	102	47.22
Total votes	216	100.00

=== 1853 ===
Richard Jones died in November 1852.

Stanley Boroughs by-election 5 January 1853
Candidate	Votes	%
Henry Russell	Show of hands	
John Lang		

=== 1855 ===
Henry Russell resigned in August 1855 to travel to England.

Stanley Boroughs by-election 8 September 1855
Candidate	Votes	%
John Richardson	unopposed	

== See also ==
- Members of the New South Wales Legislative Council, 1851-1856
