= Joe Simmons =

Joe or Joseph Simmons may refer to:

- Joe Simmons (baseball) (1845–1901), American League baseball player
- Joe Simmons (coach) (1895–1973), American football, basketball, and baseball coach
- Joseph Simmons (born 1964), American hip-hop artist and Pentecostal minister
- J. Edward Simmons (1841–1910), American lawyer and banker
- Jake Simmons (Joseph Jacob Simmons Jr., 1901–1981), African-American oilman
- Joseph Simmons (actor) (1810–1893), English-Australian actor and manager
- Joseph Simmons (guitarist) (born 1978), American guitarist
