= Electoral district of Counties of Gloucester, Macquarie, and Stanley =

Former New South Wales Legislative Council electoral district

Counties of Gloucester, Macquarie, and Stanley New South Wales—Legislative Council
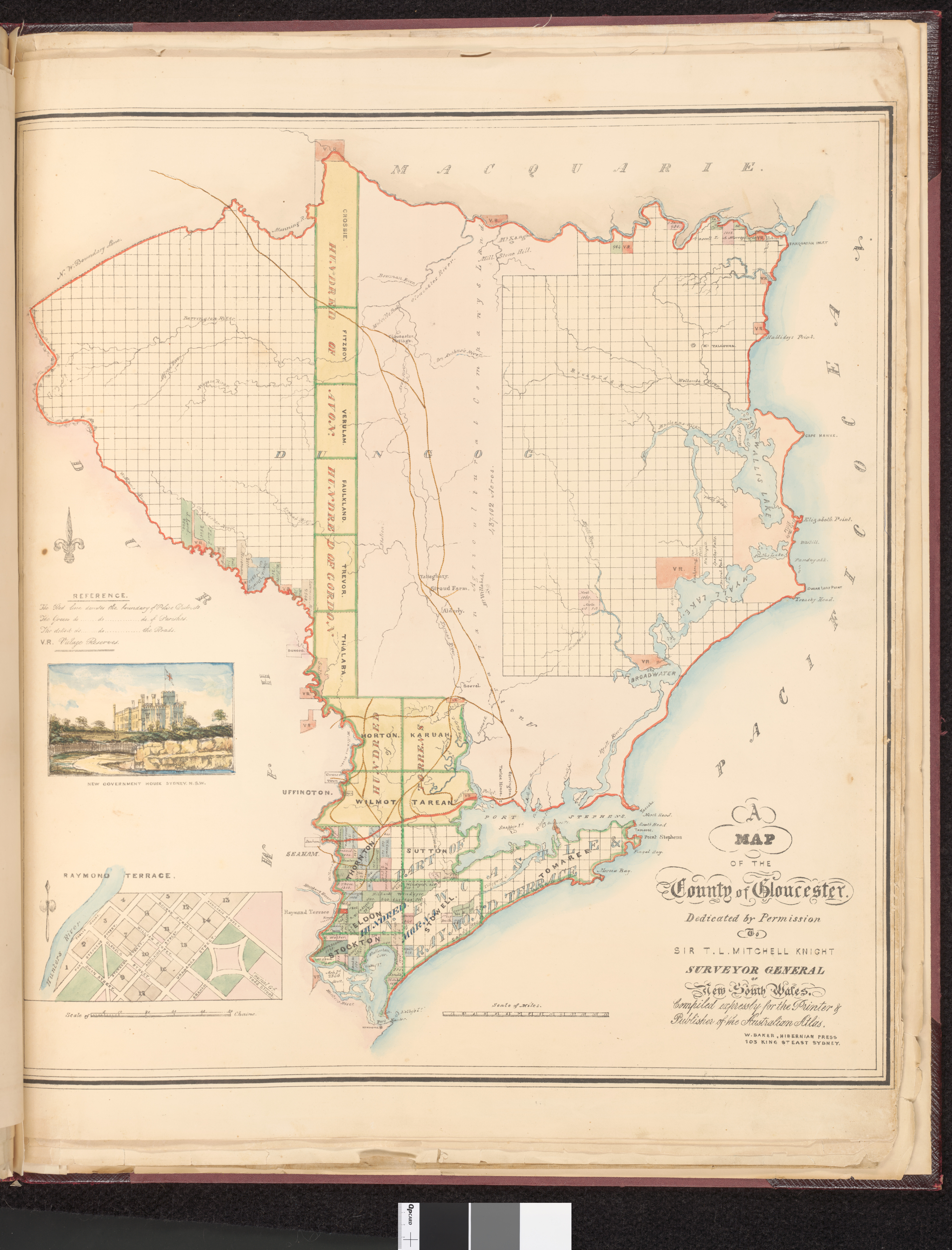
- Gloucester county in the 1840s
- State: New South Wales
- Created: 1843
- Abolished: 1851
- Namesake: Gloucester County, Macquarie County, Stanley County
- Coordinates: 30°S 153°E

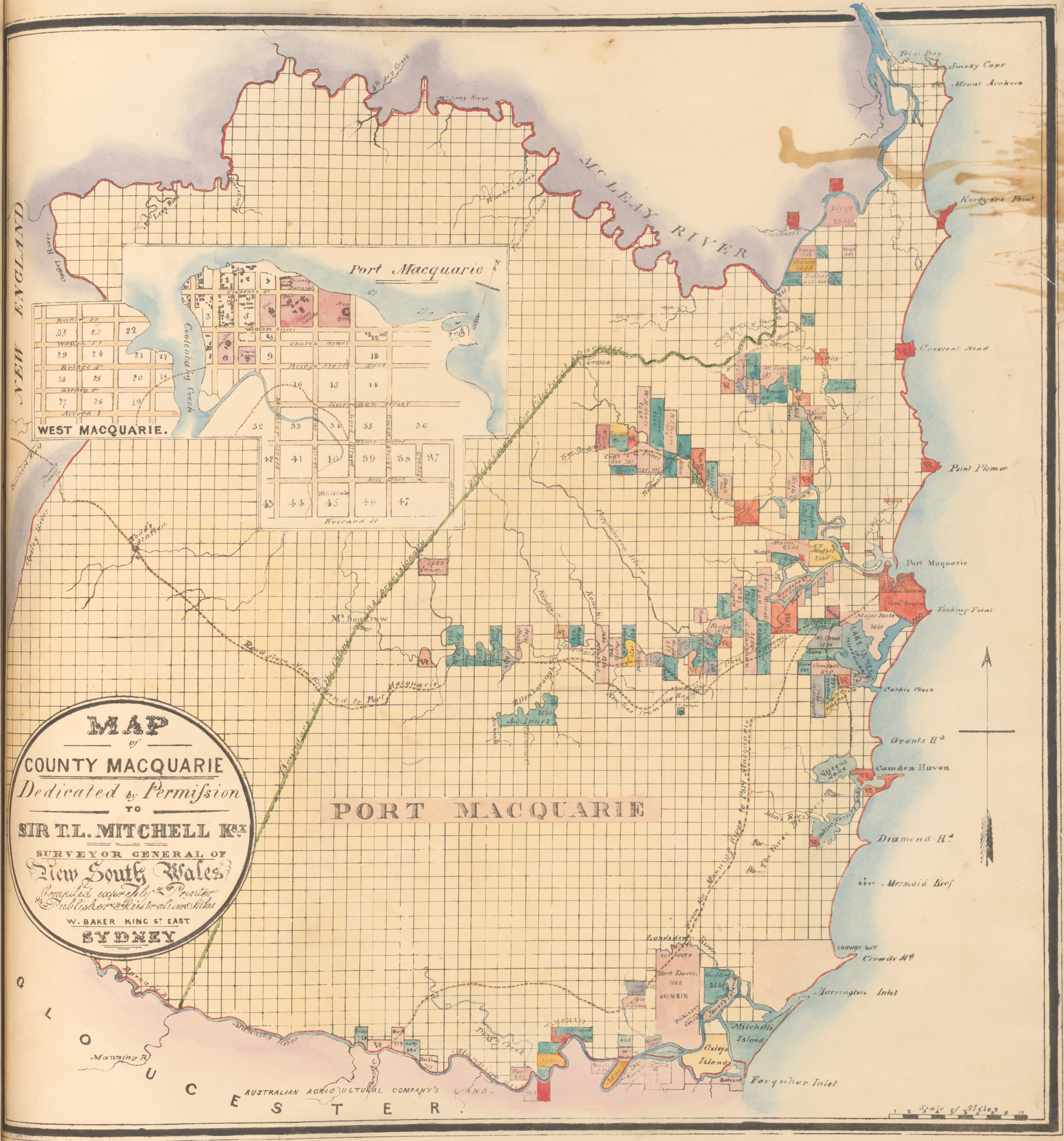
Macquarie county in the 1840s

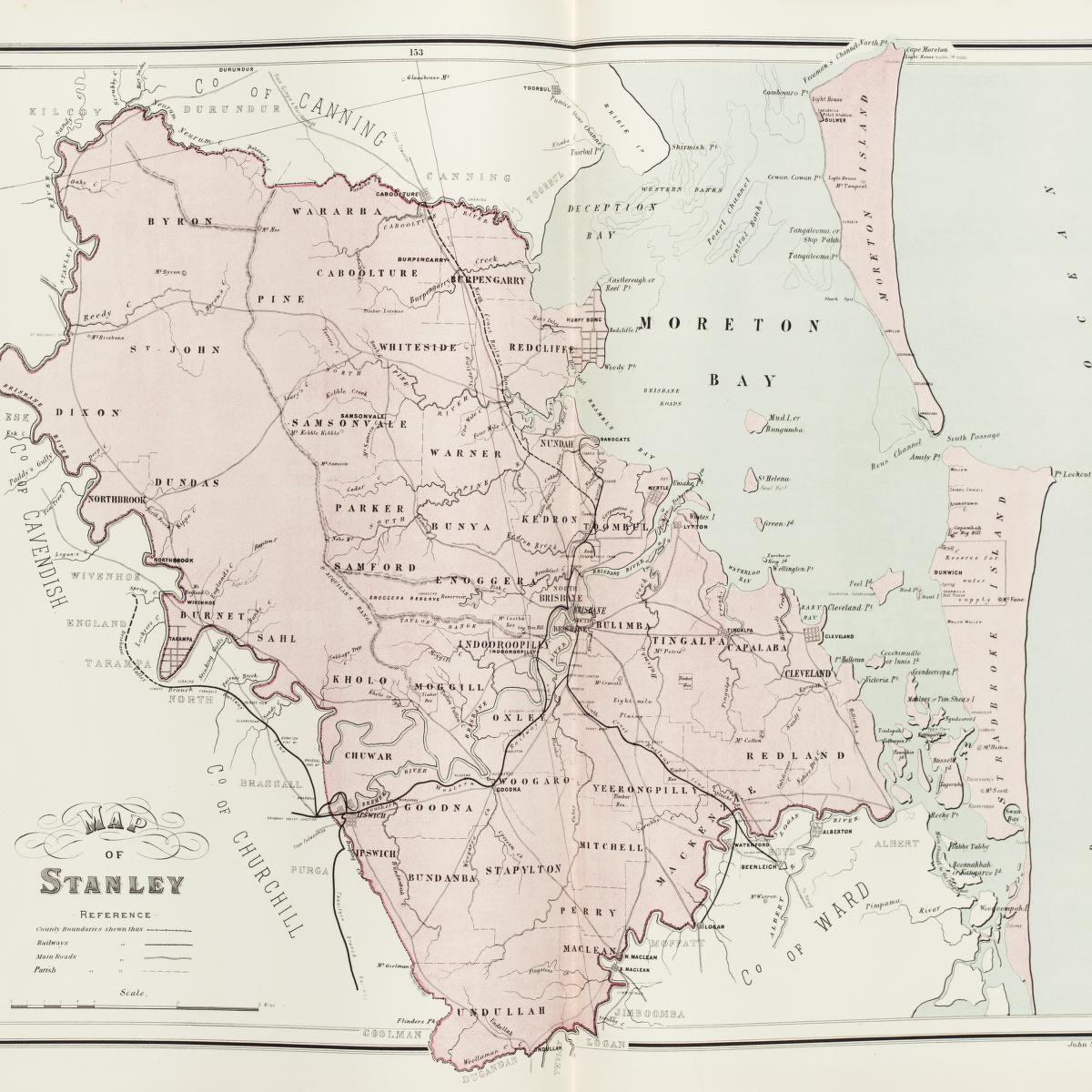
Stanley county in 1886

The Electoral district of Counties of Gloucester, Macquarie, and Stanley and from 1851, Gloucester and Macquarie, was an electorate of the partially elected New South Wales Legislative Council, created for the first elections for the Council in 1843. The counties of Gloucester and Macquarie were the settled coastal areas north of Northumberland County, while the County of Stanley was the area surrounding Brisbane, in what became part of Queensland after its separation in 1859. Polling took place at Raymond Terrace, Port Macquarie, Dungog, Stroud, Brisbane, Ipswich and Mr Rowley's residence on the Manning River. The County of Stanley was removed from the district with the expansion of the Council in 1851 and became the districts of County of Stanley and Stanley Boroughs.

In 1856 the unicameral Legislative Council was abolished and replaced with an elected Legislative Assembly and an appointed Legislative Council. The district was represented by the Legislative Assembly electorate of Gloucester and Macquarie.

== Members ==
Gloucester, Macquarie, and Stanley (1843–1851)
Member	Term
Alexander Macleay	Jun 1843 – Jun 1848
Kenneth Snodgrass	Jul 1848 – Sep 1850
Richard Jones	Oct 1850 – Jun 1851
Gloucester and Macquarie (1851–1856)
Phillip King	Jul 1851 – Jun 1856

Richard Jones went on to represent Stanley Boroughs from 1851.

== Election results ==
The County of Stanley were around one third of electors, however only 14 voted in 1843. In 1848 neither candidate visited or published any address to the County and the 54 votes were slightly in favour of Colonel Snodgrass. The 1850 by-election was the first in which a resident of the County of Stanley stood for election and the 58 votes from Brisbane were sufficient for Richard Jones to win the election.

=== 1843 ===
1843 New South Wales colonial election, 23 June: Counties of Gloucester, Macquarie, and Stanley
Candidate	Votes	%
Alexander Macleay	142	79.78
Charles Windeyer	36	20.22
Total votes	178	100.00

Alexander Macleay died on 19 June 1848 however he was not replaced as the Council was dissolved on 30 June 1848.

=== 1848 ===
1848 New South Wales colonial election, 2 August: Counties of Gloucester, Macquarie, and Stanley
Candidate	Votes	%
Kenneth Snodgrass (elected)	98	68
Archibald Boyd	47	32
Total votes	145	100
Voter turnout	48%	

The writ was not returned in time and the Governor issued a proclamation declaring the election was valid despite the delay.

=== 1850 ===
Snodgrass resigned in September 1850.

1850 Counties of Gloucester, Macquarie, and Stanley by-election, 25 October
Candidate	Votes	%
Richard Jones	66	60.55
Robert Campbell	43	39.45
Total votes	109	100.00

=== 1851 ===
1851 New South Wales colonial election, 22 September: Counties of Gloucester and Macquarie
Candidate	Votes	%
Phillip King	129	61.72
Joseph Simmons	80	38.28
Total votes	209	100.00

== See also ==
- Members of the New South Wales Legislative Council, 1843-1851 and 1851-1856
