= Gordonbrook Dam =

Dam in Queensland, Australia

- Location of the dam in Queensland
- Interactive map of Gordonbrook Dam
- Country: Australia
- Location: Kingaroy, Wide Bay-Burnett, Queensland
- Coordinates: 26°26′07″S 151°44′03″E
- Purpose: Water supply
- Status: Operational
- Opening date: 1942; 1987 (wall raised); c. 2014 (spillway repairs)
- Operator: South Burnett Regional Council

Dam and spillways
- Type of dam: Earth fill dam
- Impounds: Stuart River
- Height (foundation): 21 m (69 ft)
- Length: 480 m (1,570 ft)
- Elevation at crest: 398.2 m (1,306 ft) AHD
- Width (crest): 5.8 m (19 ft)
- Dam volume: 154×10^{3} m^{3} (5.4×10^{6} cu ft)
- Spillway type: Uncontrolled
- Spillway length: 80 m (260 ft)
- Spillway capacity: 2,000 m^{3}/s (71,000 cu ft/s)

Reservoir
- Total capacity: 6,800 ML (5,500 acre⋅ft)
- Active capacity: 6,500 ML (5,300 acre⋅ft)
- Catchment area: 605 km^{2} (234 sq mi)
- Surface area: 235 ha (580 acres)
- Maximum water depth: 3 m (9.8 ft)
- Normal elevation: 392 m (1,286 ft) AHD

The Gordonbrook Dam is an earth-filled embankment dam across the Stuart River, located in Gordonbook, in the Wide Bay-Burnett area of Queensland, Australia. Along with the Boondooma Dam, the Gordonbrook Dam is the main source of water supply for Kingaroy. Typically, due to water quality issues including algal blooms and high levels of bromide in the Gordonbrook Dam, the town water supply for Kingaroy is a 70:30 blend of water from Boondooma and Gordonbrook dams.

== Overview ==
The dam was built in 1942 to provide water for the Royal Australian Air Force Training Base during World War II. The dam wall is 21 metres (69 ft) high, 480 metres (1,570 ft), has a width of 5.8 metres (19 ft) at the crest, and holds back 6,800 megalitres (5,500 acre⋅ft) when at full capacity. The resultant reservoir covers an area of 235 hectares (580 acres), fed by a catchment area of 605 square kilometres (234 sq mi). In 1987, due to increased demand, the dam wall was raised by 3 metres (9.8 ft).

Flooding events during 2011 and 2013 caused damage to a number of areas in the channel downstream of the spillway. The Queensland Government funded repairs in excess of A$7.4 million that involved raising the height of the existing shotcrete wall to 8 metres (26 ft) above the base-level of the downstream channel. The works were completed ahead of further flooding events in 2017 and 2018.

== Recreation ==
A basic picnic area is located on the eastern shores. The picnic area is fairly large and contains a composting toilet, a water tank, picnic tables, a boat ramp, information signs and a bush walk that includes an elevated lookout and a well maintained bird hide.

When the lake area is open to public recreation, the dam provides a good range of water-based activities. The lake is largely accessible to small to medium-sized motorised boats, jetskis, canoes and windcraft. The body provides the best space for water skiing and water tubing, while the foot is best suited for boat fishing and non-motorised craft only, because of the large stands of dead timber.

In March 2022, two bodies were found chained together in the dam's waters by a kayaker,n revealed by police to be the bodies of a local couple.

During dry periods, the dam experiences high levels of blue green algae due to the dam's smaller size. Activities are at the user's own risk, and the boat ramp has gates to prevent motorised craft from entering the water during times of high risk of the algae.

=== Fishing ===
A Stocked Impoundment Permit is required to fish in all parts of the dam. The dam is stocked with Australian Bass, Golden Perch, Silver Perch, and Saratoga by the Boondooma Dam Fish Stocking and Management Association Inc. Only shore fishing is permitted.

== See also ==
- List of dams and reservoirs in Australia
