= Cedar Pocket =

Cedar Pocket may refer to:

- Cedar Pocket Dam, a dam in the Wide Bay-Burnett area of Queensland, Australia
- Cedar Pocket, Queensland, a locality in the Gympie Region, Queensland, Australia
