= Cedar Pocket Dam =

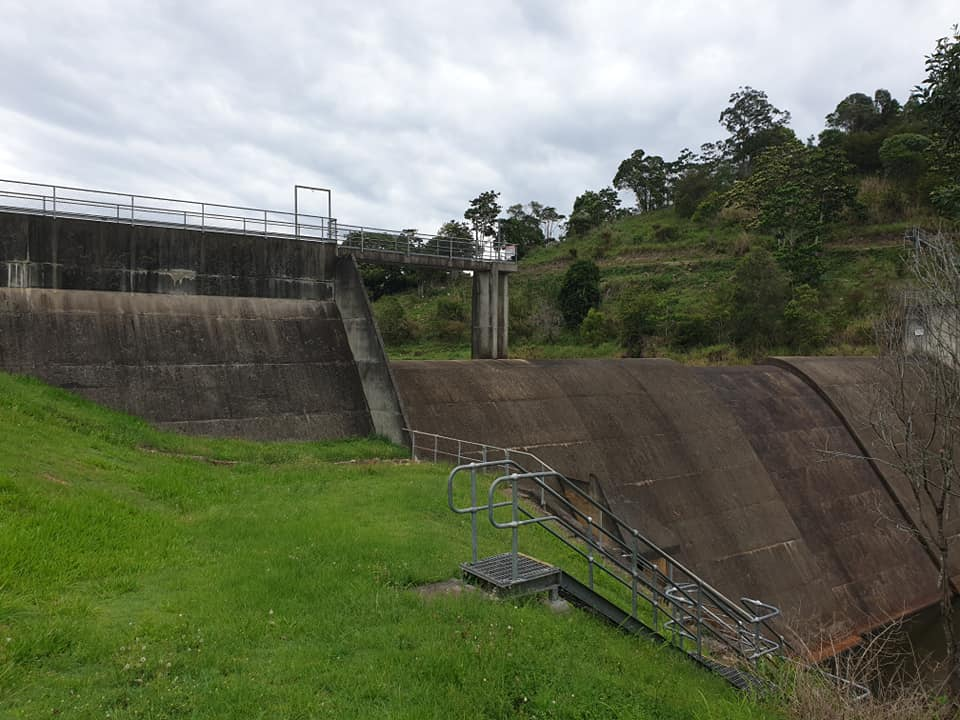
- The dam wall and spillway

- Location of the dam in Queensland
- Interactive map of Cedar Pocket Dam
- Country: Australia
- Location: Wide Bay–Burnett, Queensland
- Coordinates: 26°12′48″S 152°47′31″E
- Purpose: Irrigation
- Status: Operational
- Opening date: 1987
- Operator: SEQ Water

Dam and spillways
- Type of dam: Gravity and embankment dam
- Impounds: Deep Creek
- Height: 20 m (66 ft)
- Length: 117 m (384 ft)
- Dam volume: 8×10^{3} m^{3} (280×10^{3} cu ft)
- Spillway type: Uncontrolled
- Spillway capacity: 1,100 m^{3}/s (39,000 cu ft/s)

Reservoir
- Total capacity: 735 ML (596 acre⋅ft)
- Catchment area: 17.8 km^{2} (6.9 sq mi)
- Surface area: 22 ha (54 acres)
- Maximum water depth: 12.3 m (40 ft)
- Normal elevation: 101.07 m (331.6 ft) AHD
- Website www.seqwater.com.au

The Cedar Pocket Dam is a partially concrete gravity and rock and earth-fill embankment dam with an un-gated spillway located across the Deep Creek in the Wide Bay–Burnett region of Queensland, Australia. The main purpose of the dam is for irrigation, where the dam provides regulated water supplies along Deep Creek, a tributary of the Mary River.

== Location and features ==
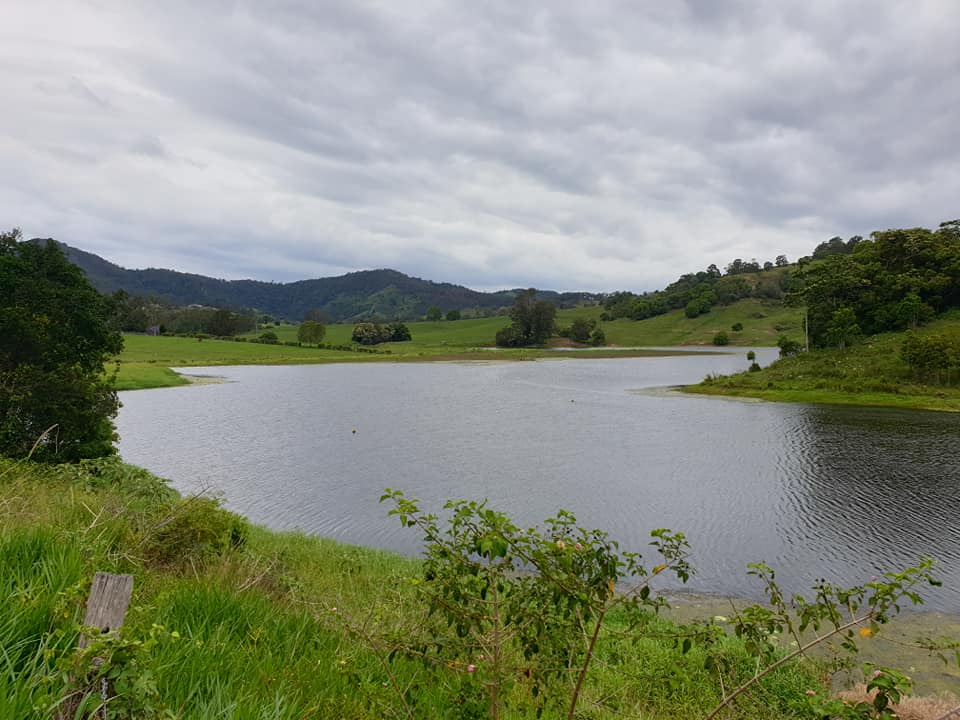
Cedar Pocket Dam at 73.9% capacity, November 2021

The Cedar Pocket Dam is located about 12 kilometres (7.5 mi) east of Gympie. The dam is managed by Seqwater.

The dam wall is 20 metres (66 ft) high and 117 metres (384 ft) long and holds back 735 megalitres (596 acre⋅ft) of water when at full capacity. The surface area of the reservoir is 22 hectares (54 acres) and the catchment area is 17.8 square kilometres (6.9 sq mi). The uncontrolled un-gated spillway has a discharge capacity of 1,110 cubic metres per second (39,000 cu ft/s).

== Recreation ==
There is a scenic lookout at Cedar Pocket Dam, however, picnic facilities and public toilets are unavailable.
