= Henry Stuart Russell =

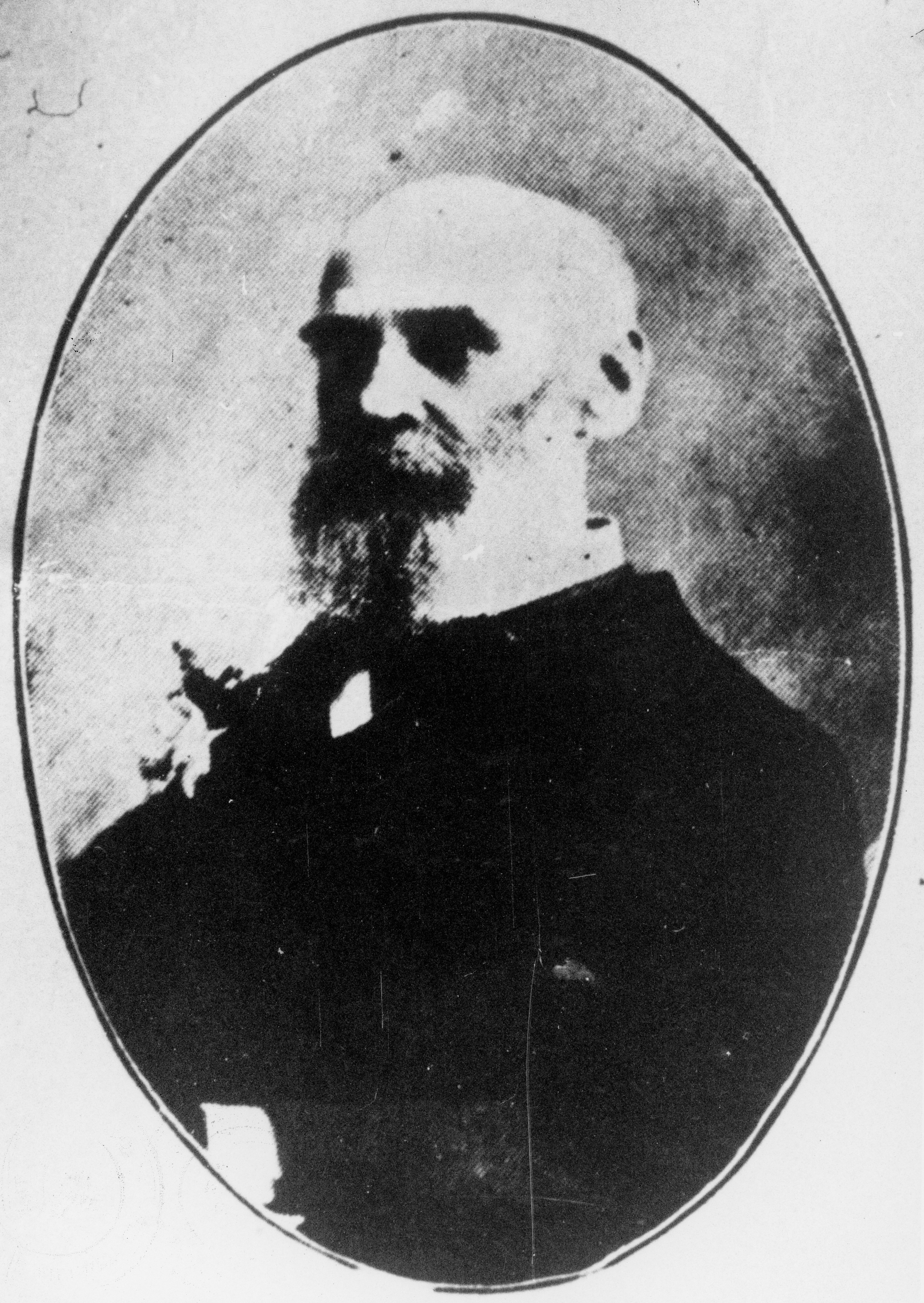
Henry Stuart Russell

Henry Stuart Russell (16 March 1818 – 5 March 1889) was an English-born explorer, politician, historian and pastoralist, best known for establishing the Cecil Plains Station around the Condamine River area of Australia.

== Early life ==
Russell was born in Halliford, Middlesex, England, the son of an East India Company officer. He was educated at Harrow and Christ Church, Oxford. He migrated to Sydney, Australia in 1840, where he stayed at a New England station belonging to Arthur Hodgson, his second cousin.

== Career ==
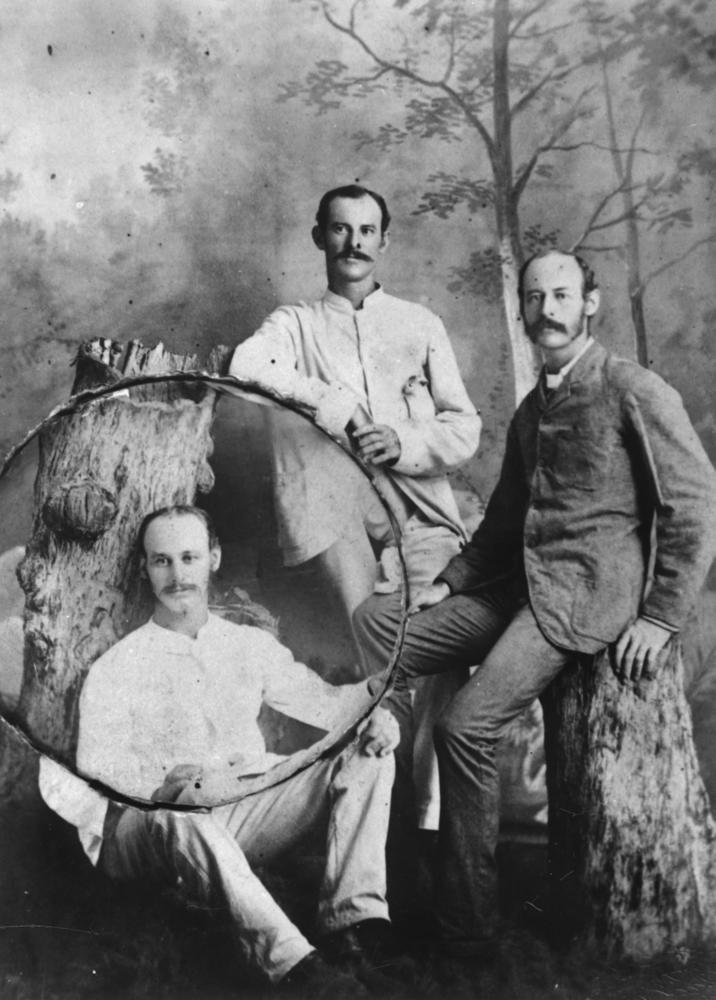
The three men from the Stuart Russell family

In May 1842, Russell joined an exploration party in search of sheep country in Wide Bay. The party was the first Europeans to discover the river later named the Mary River. They also found and brought back two escaped convicts from the penal settlement. Russell made a subsequent journey in November 1842, where he was the first European to discover the river he named the Boyne River. This expedition resulted in Russell taking up Burrandowan station.

Russell sold Burrandowan in 1847 to Philip Friell. In 1852, the pastoral run Woondul was transferred from Thomas DeLacy Moffat to Russell.

In January 1853, he was elected to the Legislative Council of New South Wales for Stanley Boroughs. In 1859, his interest in Cecil Plains was sold to James Taylor, his head stockman. He returned to Sydney, living at Mosman Bay for the following seven years. Suffering financial setbacks, he sailed for England in 1888. Also in 1888, he published a book, The Genesis of Queensland, detailing the early settlement and the growth of the pastoral industry in the area. He died at Ottery St. Mary, Devon, on 5 March 1889.

== Personal life ==
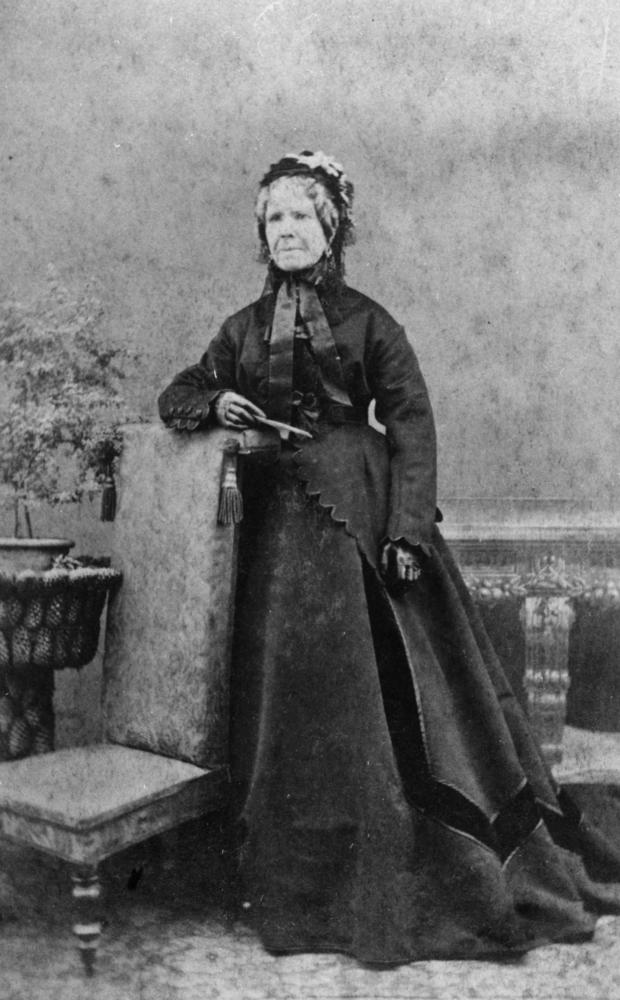
Mrs. Stuart Russell, mother of Henry Stuart Russell

Russell was married twice. His first marriage was in 1851 to Charlotte, sister of Philip Pinnock, a senior police magistrate and sheriff of Queensland. In 1874, he married Selina Oakes, who survived him with five sons from the first marriage, and a daughter from the second.

New South Wales Legislative Council
Preceded by Richard Jones	Member for Stanley Boroughs; Jan 1853 – Aug 1855	Succeeded by John Richardson
