= John James Snodgrass =

British military officer (1796–1841)

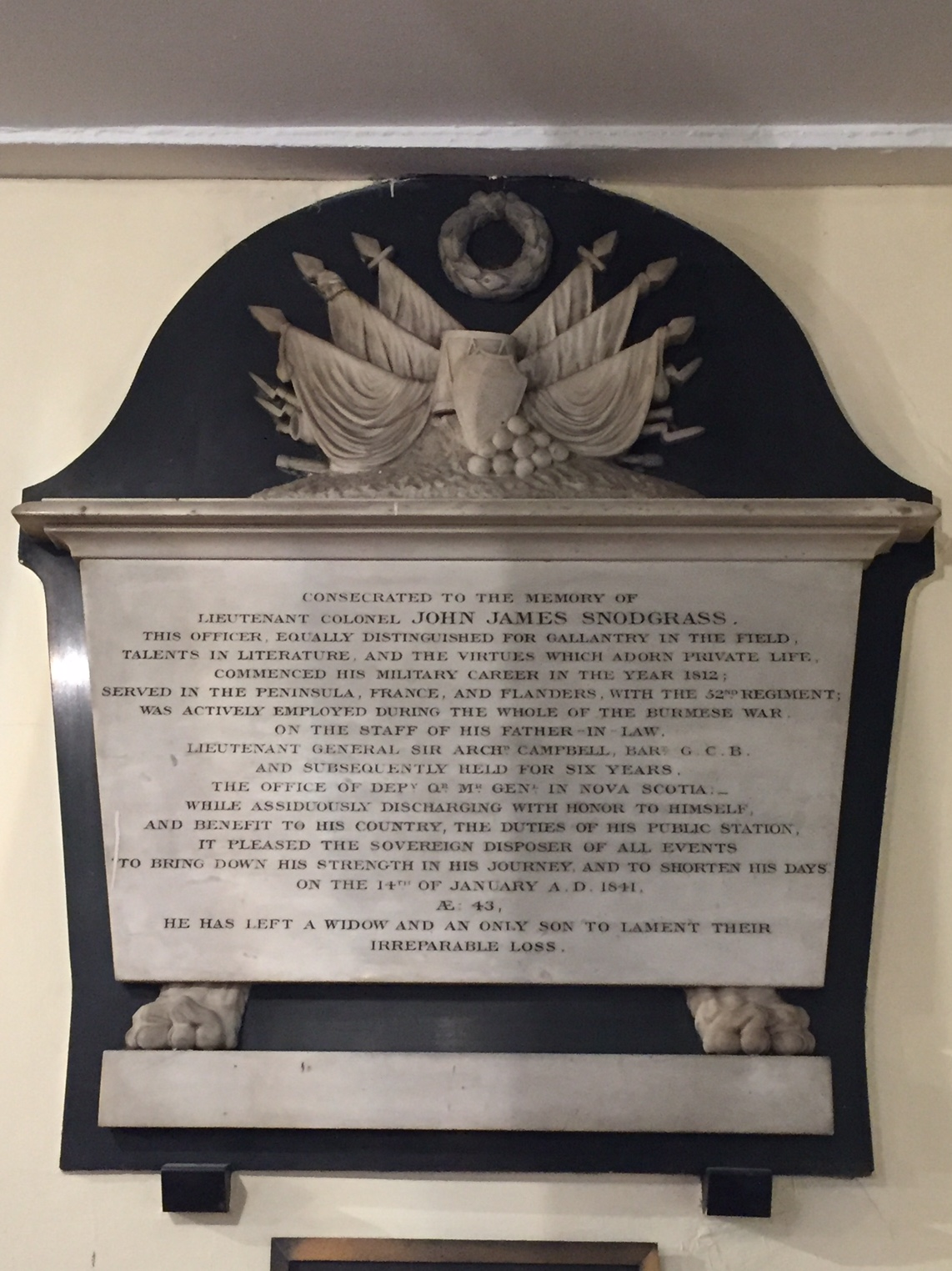
John James Snodgrass, St. Paul's Church (Halifax), Nova Scotia

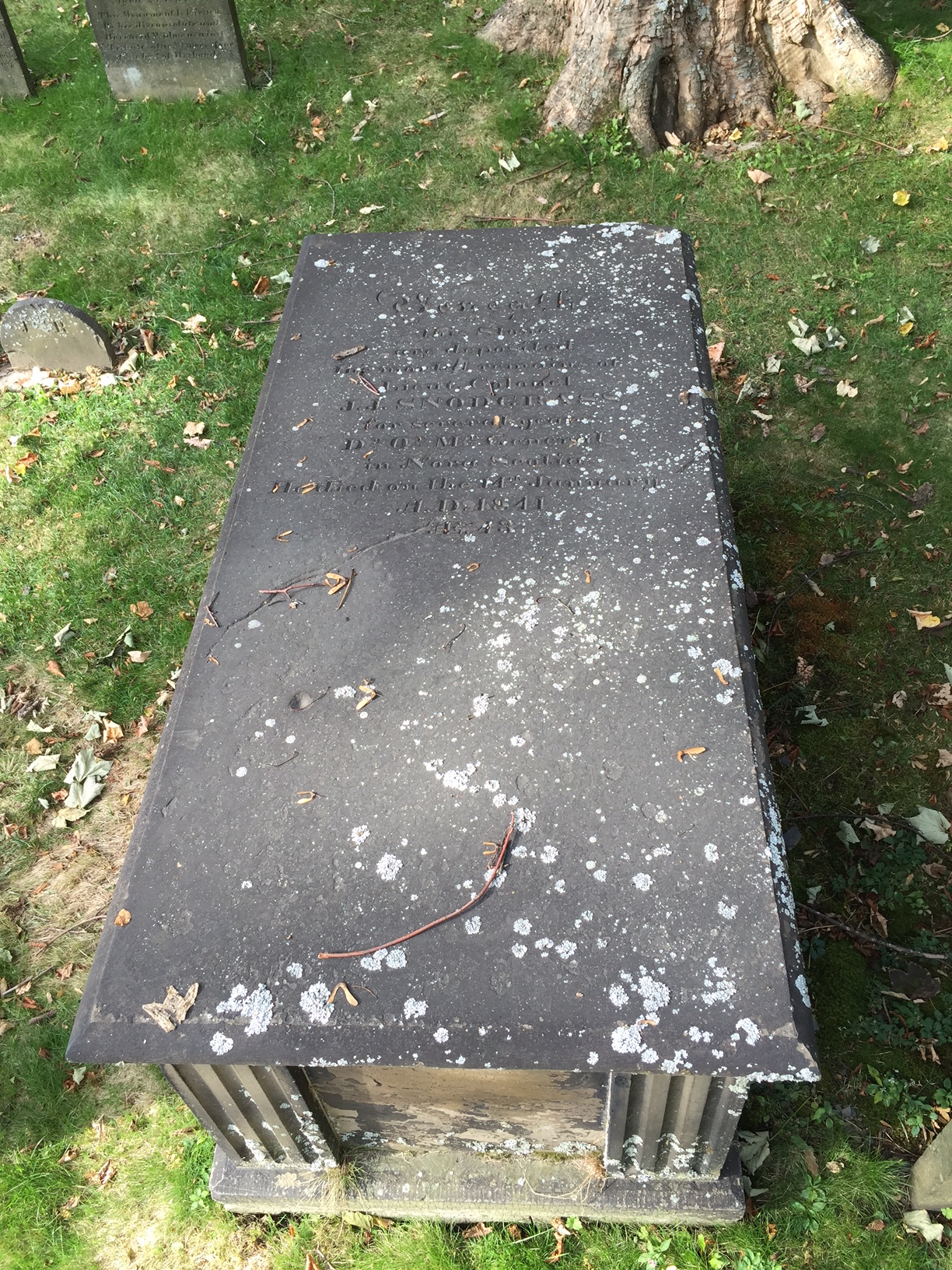
John James Snodgrass, Old Burying Ground (Halifax, Nova Scotia)

John James Snodgrass (22 October 1796 – 14 January 1841), was a British military officer, aide-de-camp and son-in-law to Sir Archibald Campbell, 1st Baronet and author. He fought in the Battle of Waterloo. The last seven years of his life were spent in Halifax, Nova Scotia where he died and is buried in the Old Burying Ground (Halifax, Nova Scotia).

== Early life ==
John James Snodgrass was born on 22 October 1796 in Paisley, Renfrewshire, Scotland. He was the son of the John Snodgrass (1744–97), a Presbyterian minister and Janet Anne Douglas Montgomery, who was the daughter of Robert Montgomery, Scottish preacher and poet. His brother was the soldier and colonial administrator in New South Wales, Colonel Kenneth Snodgrass.

== Military career ==
Snodgrass fought in the Peninsular War (1807–1814) as an ensign in the 52nd Light Infantry in c. 1812–1813, being promoted to lieutenant the following year. He fought at Pyrenees, Vera, Nivelle, Nive, Orthes, Tarbes, Toulouse, and Waterloo.

He later joined the 38th Regiment on 18 October 1821, where he was eventually appointed as the military secretary to Sir Archibald Campbell, 1st Baronet.

He then participated in the First Anglo-Burmese War (1824–1826) as Sir Campbell's assistant political agent at Ava. Snodgrass was the author of the Narrative of the Burmese War: Detailing the Operations of Major-General Sir Archibald Campbell, 1st Baronet's Army, From its landing at Rangoon in May 1824, to the conclusion of a Treaty of Peace at Yandaboo in February 1826. Snodgrass wrote his book during one of his long and arduous voyages returning him from South Asia. One reviewer in the Journal of the Royal Asiatic Society of Great Britain and Ireland severely criticized the book, accusing Snodgrass of numerous "instances of inaccuracy and exaggeration." The Quarterly Review was also uncharitable. The Eclectic Review was more favourable. In the last year of the war, he served as captain in the 91st Argyllshire Highlanders in 1825.

After the war, Snodgrass received the brevet ranks of major and lieutenant-colonel on 13 November 1826, and 28 December 1826, respectively. He served as a major of the 94th Regiment of Foot beginning on 3 August 1830 and then later as a lieutenant-colonel, unattached, on 28 June 1833. On 12 September 1834 he became the Deputy Quartermaster-General to the troops in Nova Scotia.

== Personal life ==
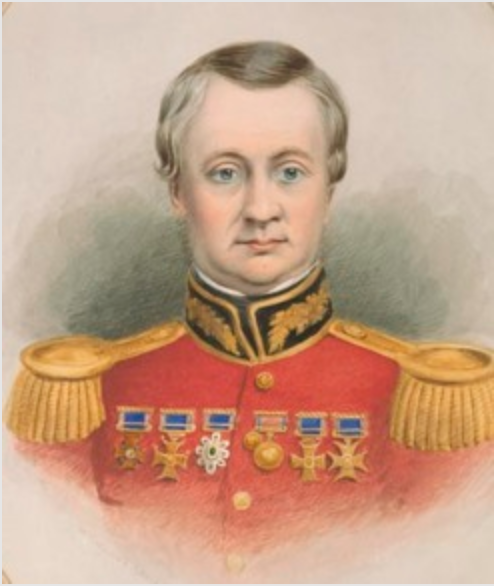
Lieut Col. Snodgrass' brother Lieut Col. Kenneth Snodgrass (1784–1853)

On 3 November 1823, Snodgrass married Sir Archibald Campbell's oldest daughter, Maria Macdonald Campbell. Maria and her family were members of the Smalls of Dirnanean in Perthshire, Scotland. The couple had one child, Archibald Campbell Snodgrass, who, following the family's military tradition, joined the 38th Regiment and served as an aide-de-camp to his uncle Sir John Campbell, 2nd Baronet during the Battle of the Great Redan.

Snodgrass died on 14 January 1841 while in Halifax, Nova Scotia, Canada. His wife and son survived him. A plaque commemorating Snodgrass's life and military service hangs in St. Paul's Church in downtown Halifax. He is buried in the military section of the Old Burying Ground in Halifax.

== Publications ==
- Snodgrass, John James (1827). Narrative of the Burmese War: Detailing the Operations of Major-General Sir Archibald Campbell, 1st Baronet's Army, From its landing at Rangoon in May 1824, to the conclusion of a Treaty of Peace at Yandaboo in February 1826. John Murray, London, England.
