= Stuart River (Queensland) =

Stuart
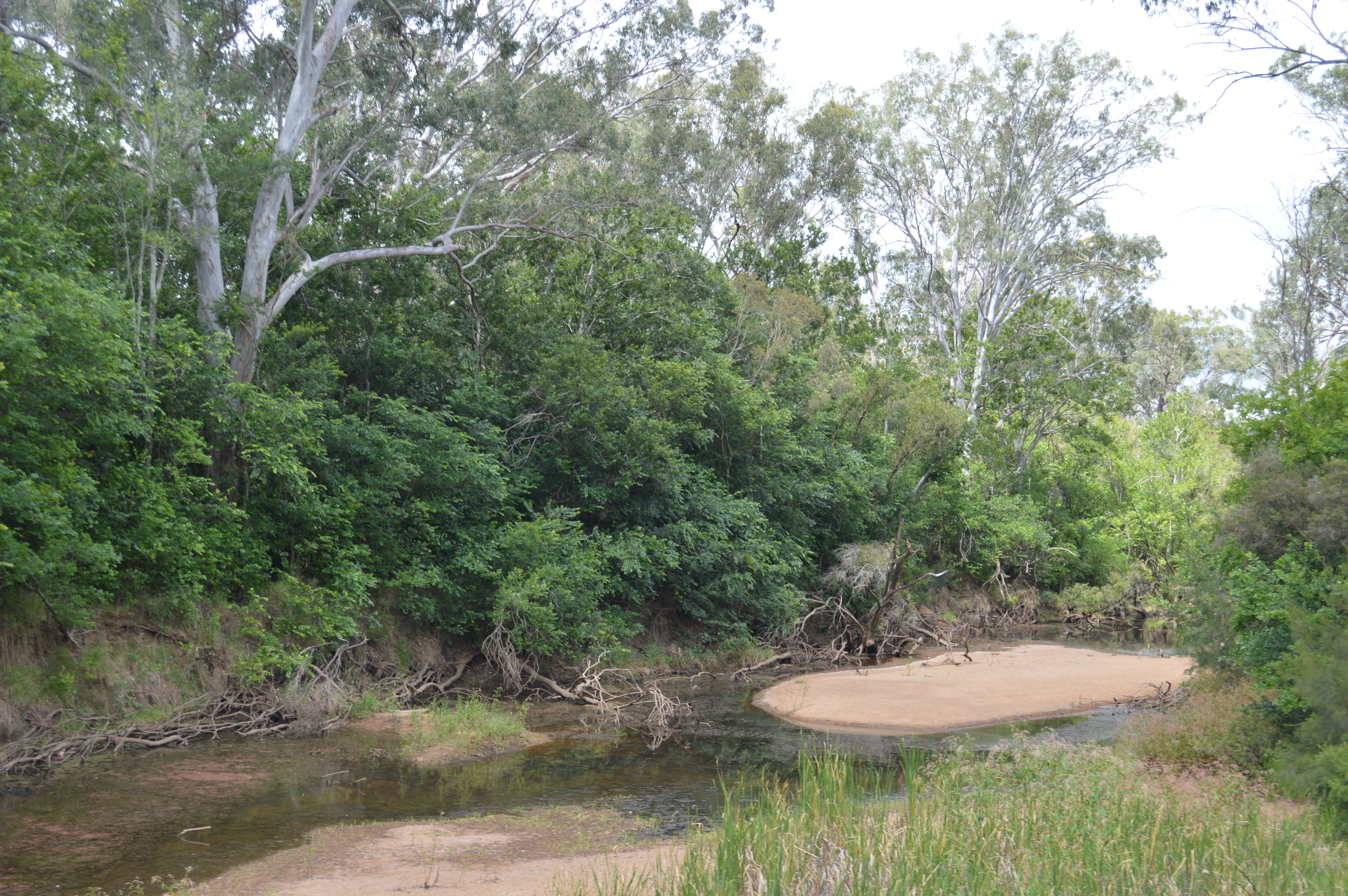
- The Stuart River, west of Proston.

- Location of Stuart River mouth in Queensland

Location
- Country: Australia
- State: Queensland
- Region: Wide Bay–Burnett
- City: Kingaroy

Physical characteristics
- Source: Stuart Range, Great Dividing Range
  - location: below Mount Kiangarow
  - coordinates: 26°48′54″S 151°32′11″E
  - elevation: 882 m (2,894 ft)
- Mouth: confluence with the Boyne River
  - location: Lake Boondooma
  - coordinates: 26°08′19″S 151°25′55″E
  - elevation: 279 m (915 ft)
- Length: 160 km (99 mi)

Basin features
- River system: Burnett River
- Reservoir: Lake Boondooma

The Stuart River is a river in the Wide Bay–Burnett region of Queensland, Australia.

== Course and features ==
The Stuart River rises in the Stuart Range, part of the Great Dividing Range, below Mount Kiangarow in the Bunya Mountains and within the Bunya Mountains National Park. The river flows generally north by east through the town of Kingaroy before flowing north by west, and west of the town of Proston. It is impounded by Gordonbrook Dam 15km north-west of Kingaroy, and by the Proston Weir 5km south-west of the small town of Proston. Finally, the river enters Lake Boondooma where it reaches its confluence with the Boyne River, a tributary of the Burnett River. The Stuart River is joined by one minor tributary. The river descends 602 metres (1,975 ft) over its 160-kilometre (99 mi) course.

The Stuart River was named by James Charles Burnett, after Henry Stuart Russell, a pastoralist, explorer and historian, who explored the area in November 1842.

== See also ==
- List of rivers of Australia § Queensland
