= Boyne River (Wide Bay–Burnett) =

Boyne
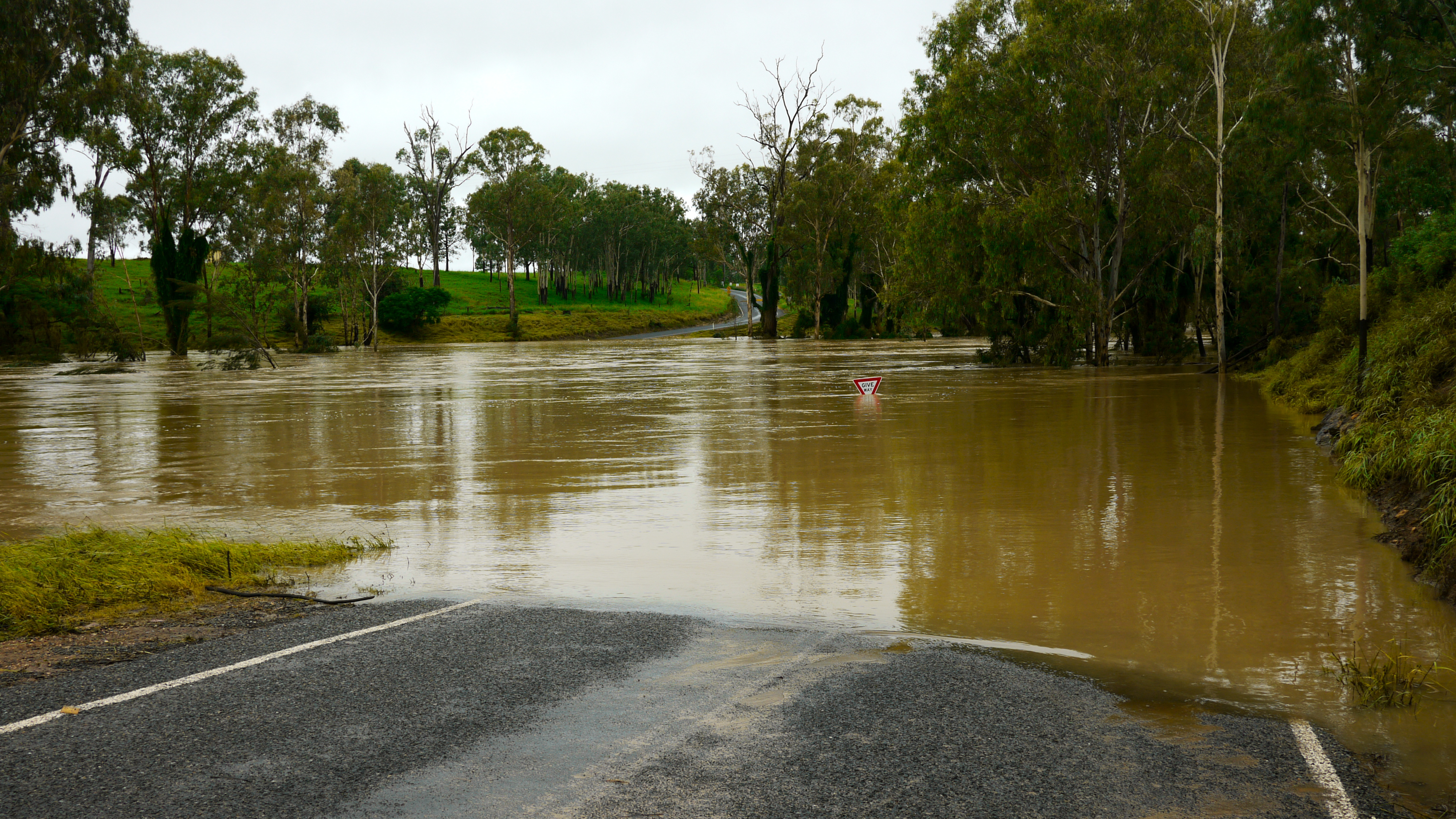
- The Boyne River in flood, 2010

- Location of Boyne River mouth in Queensland
- Etymology: Boyne River (Wide Bay–Burnett)

Location
- Country: Australia
- State: Queensland
- Region: Wide Bay–Burnett

Physical characteristics
- Source: Stuart Range, Great Dividing Range
  - location: south of Boyneside
  - coordinates: 26°45′59″S 151°31′17″E
  - elevation: 371 m (1,217 ft)
- Mouth: confluence with the Burnett River
  - location: at Boynewood
  - coordinates: 25°37′52″S 151°13′34″E
  - elevation: 116 m (381 ft)
- Length: 230 km (140 mi)

Basin features
- River system: Burnett River
- Tributaries
  - right: Stuart River
- Reservoir: Lake Boondooma

The Boyne River is a river in the Wide Bay–Burnett region of Queensland, Australia.

== Course and features ==
The Boyne River rises in the Stuart Range, part of the Great Dividing Range, south of Boyneside near Haly Mountain which is at the northwest extent of the Bunya Mountains and within the Bunya Mountains National Park. The river flows generally north joined by twenty tributaries, crossed by the Bunya Highway, and impounded near the town of Proston to form Lake Boondooma where the Boyne is joined by the Stuart River before reaching its confluence with the Burnett River upstream from Mundubbera at Boynewood. The river descends 571 metres (1,873 ft) over its 230-kilometre (140 mi) course.

The river was named in 1843 by Henry Stuart Russell under the mistaken impression the river was the same watercourse as the Boyne River located in Central Queensland.

== See also ==
- List of rivers of Australia § Queensland
