= Electoral district of Brisbane (New South Wales) =

Former state electoral district of New South Wales, Australia in the Queensland area

Brisbane New South Wales—Legislative Assembly
- State: New South Wales
- Created: July 1859
- Abolished: December 1859
- Namesake: Brisbane

Brisbane was an electoral district located in the colony of New South Wales, Australia, and was part of the New South Wales Legislative Assembly. The district created for the July 1859 election, partly replacing Stanley Boroughs and including the settlement of Brisbane. It was abolished in December 1859 due to the separation of Queensland.

== Members for Brisbane ==
Member	Party	Period
John Richardson	None	July - December 1859

== Election results ==
=== Elections in the 1850s ===
==== 1859 ====
1859 New South Wales colonial election: Brisbane Saturday 11 June
Candidate	Votes	%
John Richardson (re-elected)	unopposed	
