= John Richardson (New South Wales politician) =

Australian politician

The Honourable John Richardson
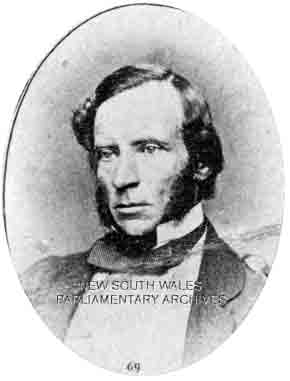

Member of the New South Wales Legislative Council
- In office 1 September 1851 – 31 March 1854
- Constituency: County of Stanley
- In office 1 September 1855 – 29 February 1856
- Constituency: Stanley Boroughs

Member of the New South Wales Legislative Assembly
- In office 7 April 1856 – 19 December 1857
- Constituency: Stanley Boroughs
- In office 1 February 1858 – 11 April 1859
- Constituency: Stanley Boroughs
- In office 10 June 1859 – 10 December 1859
- Constituency: Brisbane

Member of the New South Wales Legislative Council
- In office 13 Oct 1868 – 29 June 1887

Personal details
- Born: John Richardson; 1810 Freuchie, Fifeshire, Scotland
- Died: 22 December 1888 (aged 77 or 78) Armidale, New South Wales, Australia
- Resting place: Armidale Anglican Cemetery
- Spouse: Janet Russell (m.1847)
- Occupation: Pastoralist, Shopkeeper

John Richardson (1810 – 22 December 1888) was an Australian pastoralist, store keeper and politician. He was a member of the New South Wales Legislative Council on three occasions (1851–1854, 1855–1856 and 1868–1887) and a member of the New South Wales Legislative Assembly between 1856 and 1859.

== Early life ==
Richardson was the son of a Presbyterian minister and was educated at parish schools. He initially worked in London as a linen draper and emigrated to Sydney in 1838. Philosophically a liberal, he became politically active during the 1840s and 1850s and opposed the importation of cheap labour, whether coolie or convict and also opposed the conservative constitution proposed by William Wentworth. Richardson developed a number of pastoral stations in the Darling Downs region and also owned J. Richardson & Co, a department store in Armidale.

== Parliament ==
In September 1851, prior to the establishment of responsible government, Richardson was elected to the seat of County of Stanley in the semi-elected Legislative Council. He represented the electorate until March 1854 when he resigned his seat to undertake a long tour of Britain. On his return in September 1855 he won a by-election for the Council seat of Stanley Boroughs (including Brisbane and Ipswich) which, prior to the establishment of Queensland as a separate colony in 1859, was part of New South Wales. At the first election under the new constitution he was elected to the Legislative Assembly as one of the two members for Stanley Boroughs. At the 1859 election, Richardson successfully stood for the seat of Brisbane but resigned from the seat when Queensland was granted self-government. In October 1868, he accepted a life appointment to the New South Wales Legislative Council. He did not hold a parliamentary or ministerial position.

== Richardson's department store ==
Richardson's (J. Richardson & Co Ltd) was a department store in Armidale, New South Wales, Australia that operated between 1842 and 1992 and its hardware and agricultural business operations were bought out in 1983 and relocated as independent franchisees in Armidale and the Northern Tablelands district and remain in operation to this day.

=== History ===
Richardson began his business in Brisbane, Queensland in 1842 dealing in imports from England and ships chandlery. After suffering great losses, in 1872, Richardson relocated to the Northern Tablelands town of Armidale and occupied a store purchased from John Moore. Later in 1879, Moore set up his business again nearby however it was bought out by the firm and became the furniture department of Richardson's. The building that stands today at 195 Beardy Street was built as a 'universal providers' emporium in 1904.

The business continued serving as a modern department store for Armidale until it was downsized, split up and relocated to the old Capital Cinema building at 203 Beardy Street (now Bing Lee) in November 1983 and traded there until its final sale in April 1992.

=== Today ===
The original and now heritage listed department store on Beardy Street is now part of the Armidale Plaza shopping centre complex with major tenants in the former space now called Richardson's arcade being the long-standing women's fashion outlet Sportsgirl, menswear retailer Gazman and various other businesses.

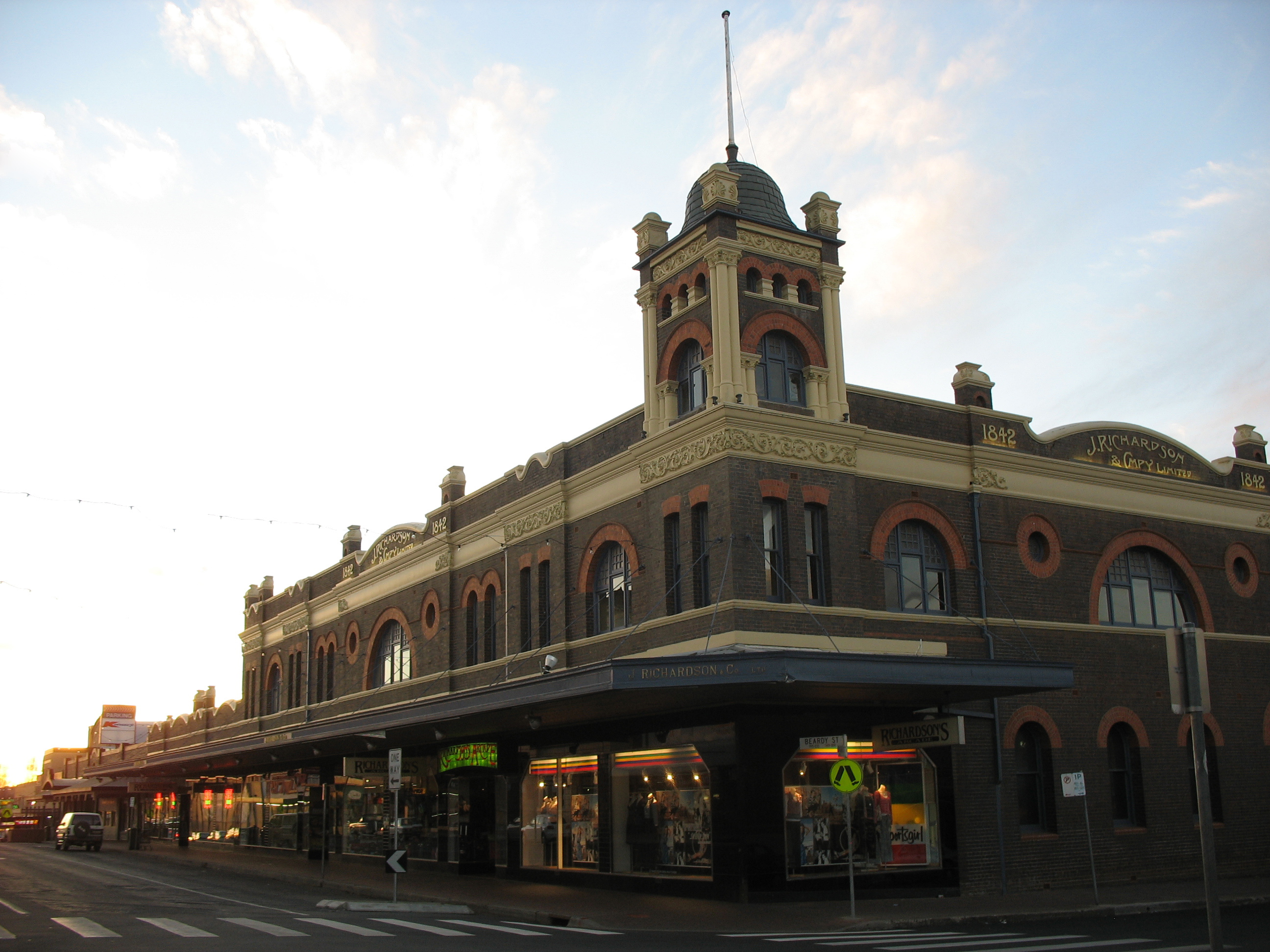
Richardson's Arcade pictured in 2006.

New South Wales Legislative Council
New district	Member for County of Stanley; Sep 1851 – Mar 1854	Succeeded by Arthur Hodgson
Preceded by Henry Russell	Member for Stanley Boroughs; Sep 1855 – Feb 1856	Council replaced by new parliament
New South Wales Legislative Assembly
New parliament	Member for Stanley Boroughs; Sep 1856 – Feb 1859; With: Thomas Holt / Benjamin Cribb	seat abolished
New district	Member for Brisbane; Jun–Dec 1859	Colony of Queensland established
