= Boondooma Dam =

Dam in Wide Bay-Burnett, Queensland, Australia

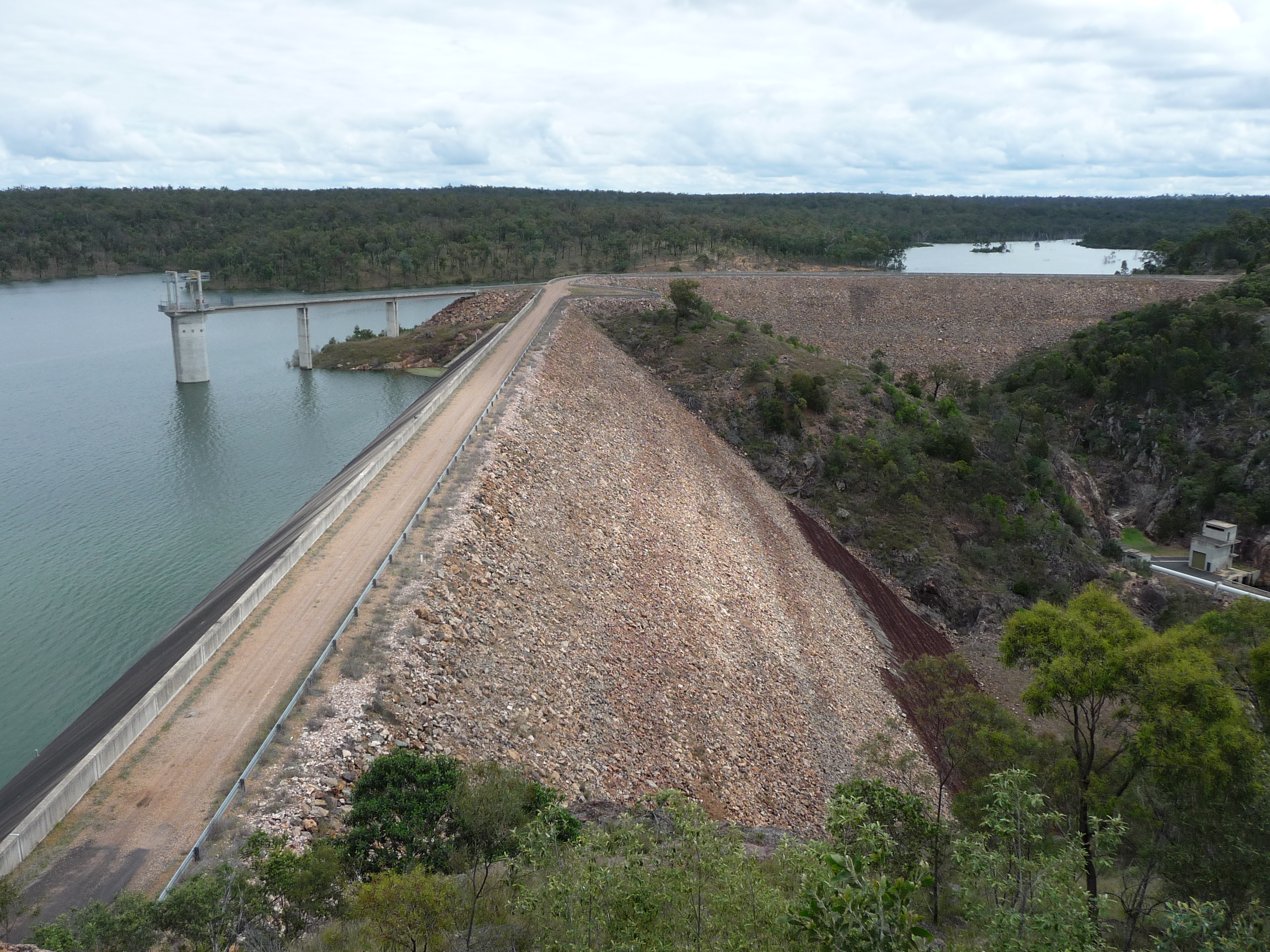
- The dam wall and reservoir from the lookout

- Location of the dam in Queensland
- Interactive map of Boondooma Dam
- Country: Australia
- Location: Proston, Wide Bay–Burnett, Queensland
- Coordinates: 26°05′41″S 151°26′01″E
- Purpose: Irrigation; Power generation
- Status: Operational
- Construction began: 1980
- Opening date: 1983
- Built by: Citra Constructions; White Industries
- Operator: SunWater

Dam and spillways
- Type of dam: Rock-fill dam
- Impounds: Boyne River; Stuart River
- Height (foundation): 63 m (207 ft)
- Length: 445 m (1,460 ft)
- Dam volume: 944×10^{3} m^{3} (33.3×10^{6} cu ft)
- Spillway type: Uncontrolled
- Spillway capacity: 1,340 m^{3}/s (47,000 cu ft/s)

Reservoir
- Creates: Boondooma Lake
- Total capacity: 204,200 ML (165,500 acre⋅ft)
- Catchment area: 4,200 km^{2} (1,600 sq mi)
- Surface area: 18.15 km^{2} (7.01 sq mi)
- Maximum length: 599 m (1,965 ft)
- Maximum water depth: 11 m (36 ft)
- Normal elevation: 280.4 m (920 ft) AHD

The Boondooma Dam is a rock-filled embankment dam across the Boyne River on the boundary of Boondooma and Proston in the South Burnett Region of Queensland, Australia. Built between 1980 and 1983, the dam was constructed across the Boyne River below its confluence with the Stuart River, forming the resultant reservoir, Lake Boondooma.

== Overview ==
The dam wall is 63 metres (207 ft) high and 455 metres (1,493 ft) long. The result reservoir holds 204,200 megalitres (165,500 acre⋅ft) of water when at full capacity, and has an average depth of 11 metres (36 ft). The surface area of the reservoir is 18.15 square kilometres (4,480 acres) and the catchment area is 4,200 km^{2} (1,600 sq mi). The uncontrolled un-gated spillway has a discharge capacity of 1,340 cubic metres per second (47,000 cu ft/s). The dam forms a narrow and deep lake, designed to avoid evaporation, with one fork containing much standing timber and another having many submerged rocky outcrops. The dam is managed by SunWater.

The dam overflowed for the first time in May 1983. The lowest level recorded was 0.18% capacity in December 1982, and the maximum of 173.8% (6.17 metres (20.2 ft) over the spillway) was recorded in January 2013 as a result of heavy rain from ex Tropical Cyclone Oswald.

=== Water supply ===
It was built to supply water to the Tarong Power Station and as is the case at so many impoundments, takes its name from the original property in the area. The dam also supplies water to irrigate agricultural properties in the area.

Typically, the dam supplies between 50 to 80 megalitres (41 to 65 acre⋅ft) of water per day to Tarong Power Station. The dam was connected to the Western Corridor Recycled Water Project to ensure water levels would not interfere with power generation in times of drought.

SunWater upgraded the capacity of the spillway to ensure the highest level of safety for dams under their jurisdiction is maintained.

== Recreation ==
Since March 2001, camping and recreational facilities at the dam have been managed by the Wondai Shire Council, and since council amalgamations, South Burnett Regional Council. Self-contained cabins, caravan sites and camping are all available by the lake. There are also multiple picnic grounds for day-trippers. Angling, swimming, sailing and water skiing are all popular activities at Boondooma Dam.

=== Fishing ===
The dam is stocked with bass, golden perch, silver perch and barramundi, while eel-tailed catfish, and bony bream are present naturally. A Stocked Impoundment Permit is required to fish in the dam. In 1993 and 1994, more than 60,000 barramundi were released into the dam, thought the furthest south that the species could survive. Limited numbers have been caught since, but greater success was achieved at locations closer to the coast of similar latitude.

=== Boating ===
The dam has two boat ramps and a boating permit is not required. There are no boating restrictions on the dam, however a no fishing/boating zone applies around the dam wall.

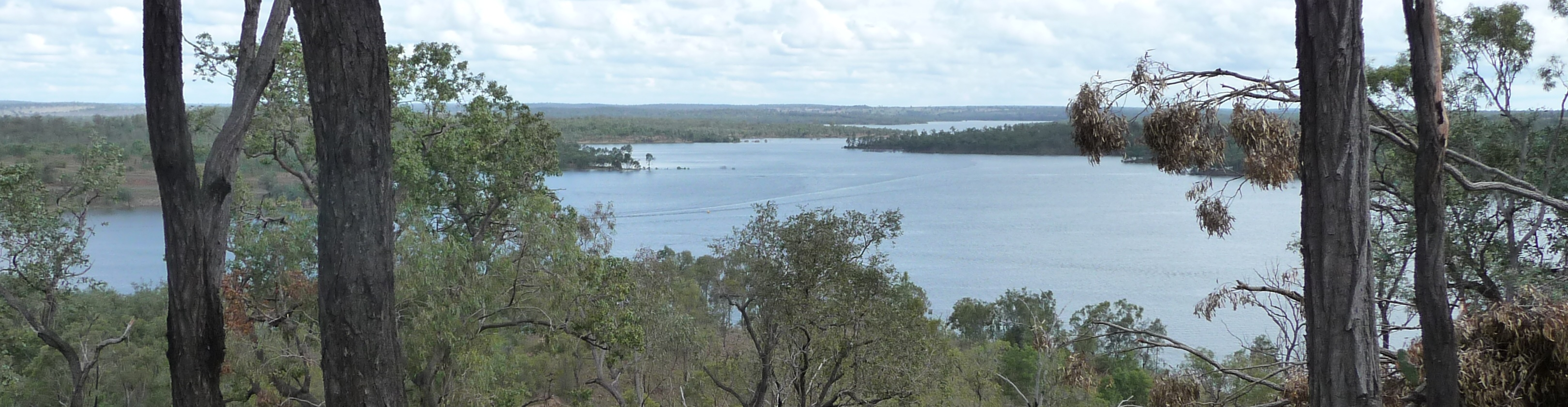
A view of Lake Boondooma

== See also ==
- List of dams and reservoirs in Australia
