= Kenneth Snodgrass =

Scottish Australian politician

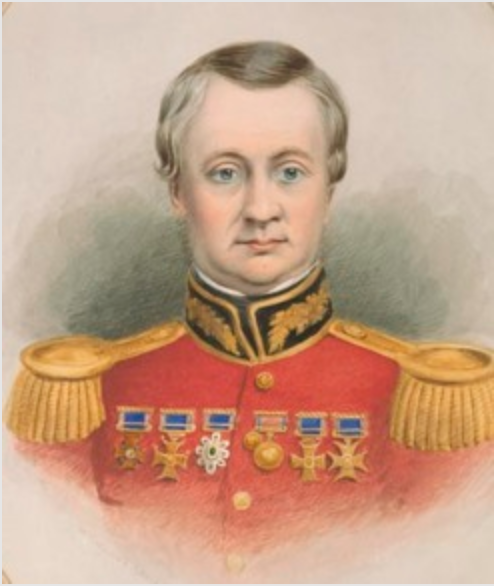
- Kenneth Snodgrass
- Born: 1784; Paisley, Scotland
- Died: 14 October 1853 (aged 68–69) Raymond Terrace, Colony of New South Wales
- Allegiance: United Kingdom; Kingdom of Portugal (1809-1814)
- Rank: Lieutenant-Colonel
- Conflicts: Peninsular War
- Awards: Companion of Order of the Bath

Kenneth Snodgrass CB (1784 – 14 October 1853) was a Scottish-born soldier and colonial administrator. He acted as lieutenant-governor of Van Diemen's Land and governor of New South Wales for brief periods.

== Early life ==
Snodgrass was born in Paisley, Scotland, the son of the Reverend Dr John Snodgrass, M.A., DD (1744–97), a Presbyterian minister, author and pamphleteer; and Janet, née Mackenzie (1762-1852), who was descended from the Chiefs of Clan Mackenzie of Kintail, in the Scottish Highlands. His brother was John James Snodgrass.

Kenneth Snodgrass enlisted in the British Army in 1802 as an ensign and was promoted to lieutenant in 1804. He served in Sicily and Sweden, was promoted captain in 1808, and fought in the Peninsular War with the Portuguese army from 1809 to 1814. Promoted major, in 1813 he commanded a corps of 400 grenadiers at the battle of Vitoria, then led a forlorn hope in the Siege of San Sebastian. He suffered a severe head wound at the Battle of Orthes in 1814, was appointed Companion of the Order of the Bath in 1815, and promoted lieutenant-colonel in 1817. He remained in the Portuguese army until 1822.

Snodgrass had married Janet Wright in 1814, during his time stationed in Portugal, where they began raising a family. Eventually they had six children.

== Colony of New South Wales ==
In December 1828 he arrived in Sydney, capital of the Colony of New South Wales, with his wife and six children, where on 1 January 1829 he was appointed commandant of the recently created New South Wales Mounted Police. On 19 November 1833 he was appointed a member of the New South Wales Legislative Council, and remained a member until 6 December 1838.

== Acting lieutenant governor ==
He served as acting Lieutenant-Governor of Van Diemen's Land (now Tasmania) from October 1836 to January 1837, between the terms of George Arthur and Sir John Franklin.

== Acting governor ==
He was Acting Governor of New South Wales for two months from late 1837 to early 1838, between the departure of the outgoing governor Richard Bourke and the arrival of his replacement, George Gipps. While in this role Snodgrass despatched a Sydney mounted police detachment to pursue the Namoi, Weraerai and Kamilaroi people who had killed five stockmen in separate incidents on recently established pastoral runs in the upper Gwydir River area of New South Wales. Tragically this led to the events in January 1838 which became known as the Waterloo Creek massacre (or the Australia Day Massacre). On 26 January 1838, a New South Wales Mounted Police detachment led by Major James Nunn murdered perhaps 40 to 50 men, women and children. (Some historians claim up to 300 people were killed). The group attacked an encampment of Kamilaroi people at a place that came to be called Waterloo Creek, in remote north west New South Wales.

== Later life ==
Snodgrass served again in the Legislative Council from 1848 to 1850, having been elected as the member for the Counties of Gloucester, Macquarie and Stanley.

His daughter Mary married New South Wales politician Archibald Jacob, and his son Peter became a pastoralist and politician in Victoria. Snodgrass died at Raymond Terrace, New South Wales, in 1853.
