= Electoral district of Stanley County =

Former state electoral district of New South Wales, Australia

Stanley County New South Wales—Legislative Assembly
- State: New South Wales
- Created: 1856
- MP: 1859
- Namesake: County of Stanley
- Coordinates: 27°30′S 153°00′E

Stanley County was an electoral district for the Legislative Assembly in the Colony of New South Wales created in 1856 election, named after and including County of Stanley (part of Queensland after 1859), except for the towns of North Brisbane, South Brisbane, Kangaroo Point and Ipswich, which were in Stanley Boroughs. It was abolished in 1859 and replaced with East Moreton and West Moreton.

== Members for Stanley County ==
Member	Party	Period
Henry Buckley	None	1856–1859

== Election results ==
=== 1856 ===
1856 New South Wales colonial election: Stanley County
Candidate	Votes	%
Henry Buckley (elected)	304	74.3
William Dorsey	105	25.7
Total formal votes	409	100.0
Informal votes	0	0.0
Turnout	409	52.3

Polling was conducted on 9 April 1856. Sitting Legislative Councillor for County of Stanley was John Dunmore Lang who did not contest the election.

=== 1858 ===
1858 New South Wales colonial election: Stanley County 8 February
Candidate	Votes	%
Henry Buckley (re-elected)	unopposed	
