= Electoral district of Stanley Boroughs =

Electoral district in Australia

Stanley Boroughs New South Wales—Legislative Assembly
- State: New South Wales
- Created: 1856
- Abolished: 1859
- Namesake: County of Stanley

Stanley Boroughs was an electoral district for the Legislative Assembly in the Australian state of New South Wales created in 1856 election, named after the County of Stanley (part of Queensland after 1859) and including the towns of North Brisbane, South Brisbane, Kangaroo Point and Ipswich. The surrounding rural parts of the County of Stanley were in Stanley County. It was abolished in 1859 and replaced with Brisbane and Ipswich.

== Members for Stanley Boroughs ==
Member	Party	Period	Member	Party	Period
John Richardson	None	1856–1859	Thomas Holt	None	1856–1857
John Richardson	None	1856–1859	Benjamin Cribb	None	1858–1859

== Election results ==
=== 1856 ===
1856 New South Wales colonial election: Stanley Boroughs
Candidate	Votes	%
Thomas Holt (elected 1)	320	32.6
John Richardson (elected 2)	316	32.2
Arthur Macalister	179	18.2
Frederick Forbes	167	17.0
Total formal votes	983	100.0
Informal votes	0	0.0
Turnout	627	50.4

Polling was conducted on 7 April 1856. Richardson had represented this district in the old Legislative Council.

=== 1858 ===
1858 New South Wales colonial election: Stanley Boroughs 1 February 1858
Candidate	Votes	%
Benjamin Cribb (elected 1)	492	43.7
John Richardson (re-elected 2)	481	42.7
Edward Browne	153	13.6
Total formal votes	1,126	100.0
Informal votes	0	0.0
Turnout	1,126	37.3

The sitting member Thomas Holt unsuccessfully contested Cumberland (South Riding).
