= Electoral district of County of Stanley =

Former legislative council electoral district of New South Wales, Australia

County of Stanley New South Wales—Legislative Council
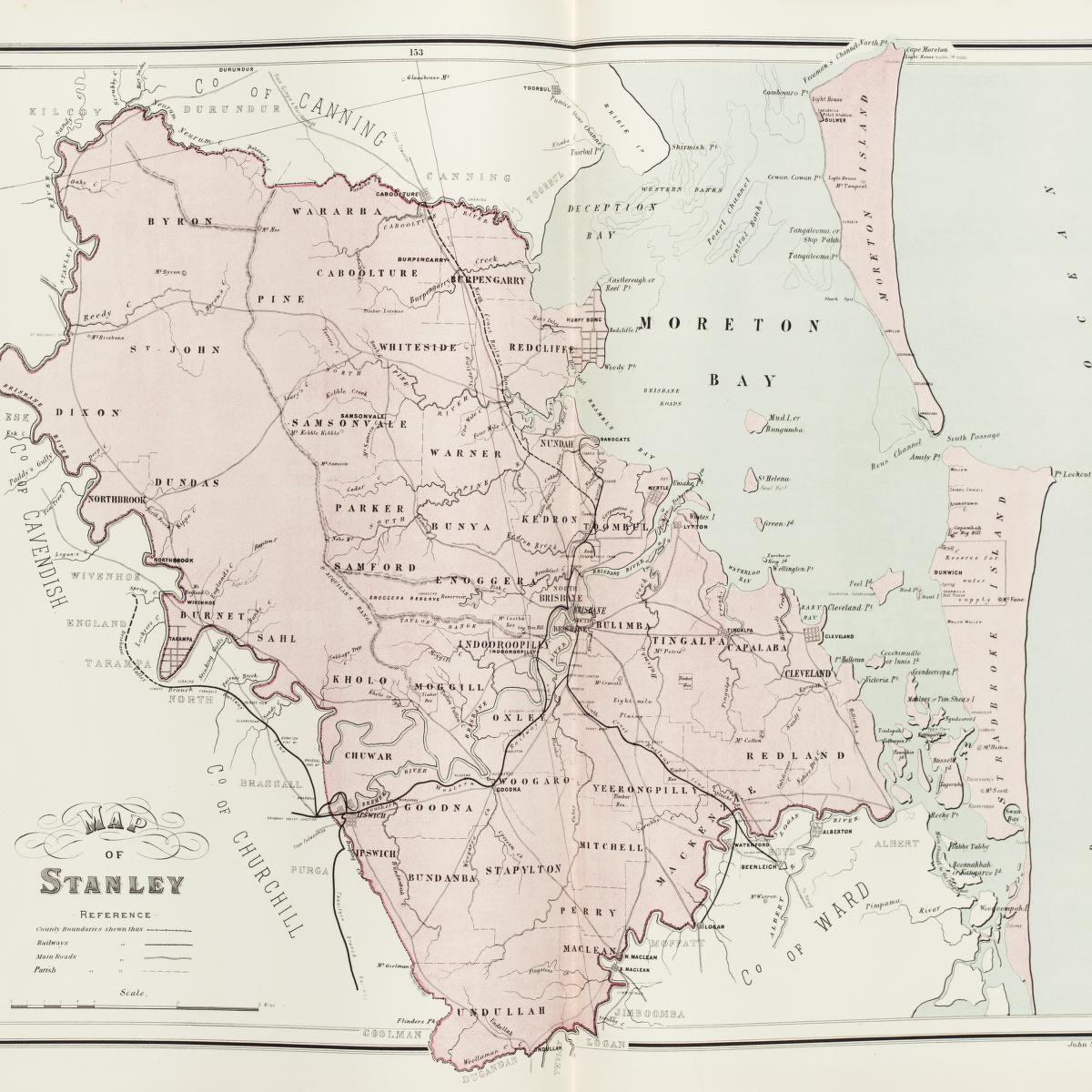
- Stanley county in 1886
- State: New South Wales
- Created: 1851
- Abolished: 1856
- Namesake: County of Stanley
- Coordinates: 27°30′S 153°00′E

The Electoral district of County of Stanley was an electorate of the New South Wales Legislative Council at a time when some of its members were elected and the balance were appointed by the Governor. It was a new electorate created in 1851 by the expansion of the Legislative Council to 54 members, with 18 to be appointed and 36 elected. The previous district of Counties of Gloucester, Macquarie, and Stanley was split into the districts of Gloucester & Macquarie, Stanley and Stanley Boroughs, which included North Brisbane, South Brisbane, Kangaroo Point and Ipswich.

In 1856 the unicameral Legislative Council was abolished and replaced with an elected Legislative Assembly and an appointed Legislative Council. The district was represented by the Legislative Assembly electorate of Electoral district of Stanley County.

== Members ==
Member	Term
John Richardson	Sep 1851 – Mar 1854
Arthur Hodgson	Mar 1854 – Jul 1854
John Lang	Aug 1855 – Feb 1856

== Election results ==
=== 1851 ===
1851 New South Wales colonial election, 13 September: County of Stanley
Candidate	Votes	%
John Richardson	57	65.52
William Wilson	30	34.48
Total votes	87	100.00

=== 1854 (1) ===
John Richardson resigned in March 1854.

County of Stanley by-election 28 April and 23 May 1854
Candidate	Votes	%
Arthur Hodgson	57	50.0
John Lang	57	50.0
Total votes	114	100.0

As the votes were tied, the returning officer had a casting vote which he gave for Arthur Hodgson.

=== 1854 (2) ===
Arthur Hodgson's election was declared void.

County of Stanley by-election 10 August 1854
Candidate	Votes	%
John Lang	57	50.44
Arthur Hodgson	56	49.56
Total votes	113	100.0
