= Joseph Simmons (actor) =

Jewish actor and theatre manager

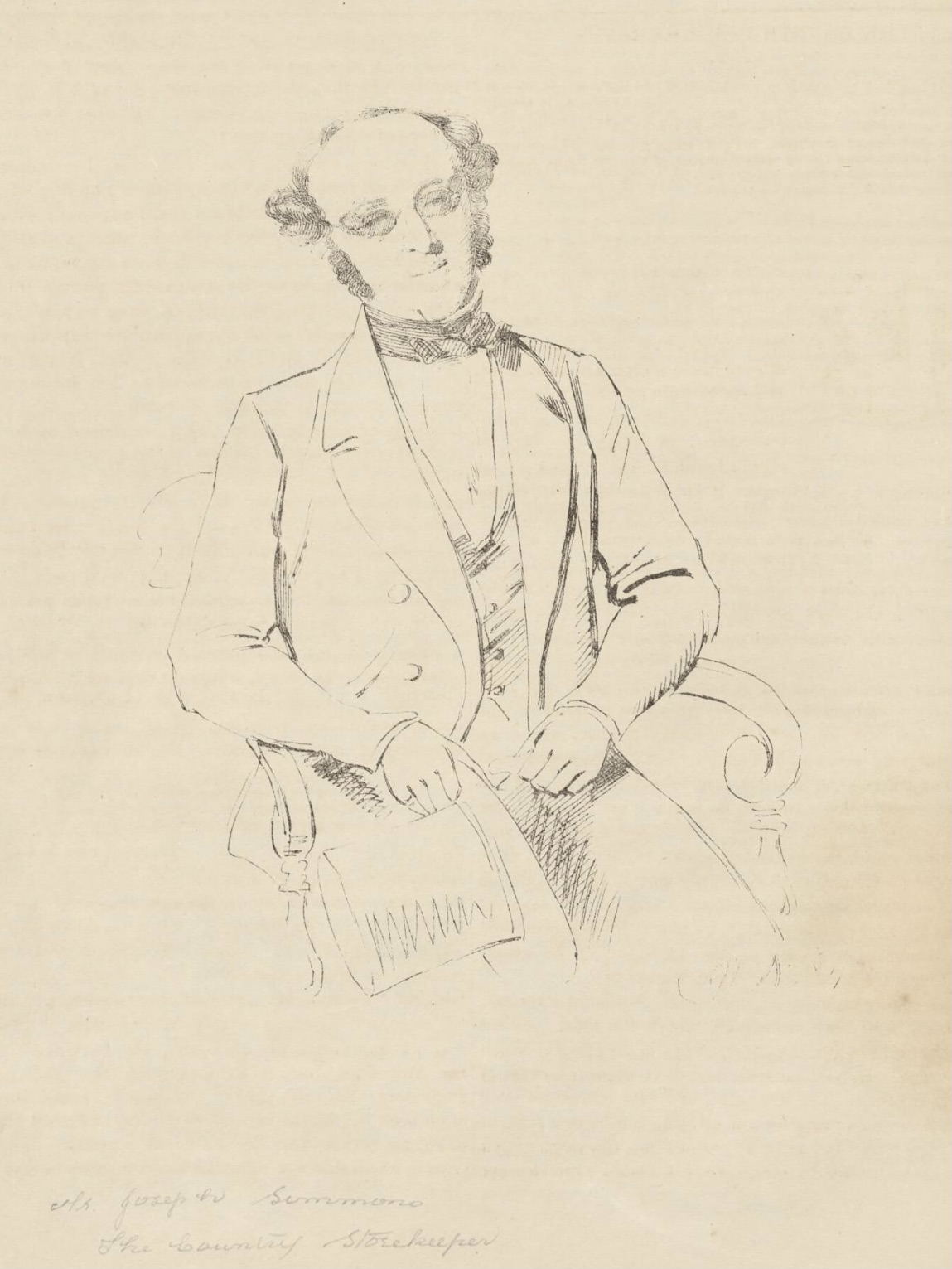
Joseph Simmons "the country storekeeper" in 1848

Joseph Simmons sen. (c. 1810 – 9 August 1893) was a Jewish actor and theatre manager in the early days of Sydney, Australia.

== History ==
Simmons was a son of Nathan Simmons and his wife Sarah Simmons.

He was attracted to the stage from age 12, and played in English provincial theatres.

He arrived in Sydney in May 1830 and established an auction house at 61 George Street, and in January 1834 he founded a drapery shop "Paddington House", in Underwood's Building, also on George Street.

In February 1834 Simmons entered into partnership with Barnett Levey (died 1837) in his Theatre Royal business, but left after a year.

In 1835 he joined a consortium that took over the Theatre Royal and again became its manager. In September 1835 he played Macbeth in the first performance of the "Scottish play" in Sydney; he also played Mercutio in Romeo and Juliet and Iago in Othello.

In November 1836 he joined in partnership with Solomon Marks in founding Simmons & Marks, auctioneers; they declared insolvency and partnership was dissolved in September 1837.

In July 1838 he took over management of the Victoria Theatre for Joseph Wyatt, who had been one of the Theatre Royal's co-lessees.

In March 1839 he became licensee of the Flower Pot hotel on York Street.

In 1841 he applied for Sydney's second theatre licence, but was unsuccessful, being was beaten by Luigi Dalle Case, who opened his Olympic Theatre on Hunter Street in January 1842.

In February 1842 Simmons returned as manager and performer at the Victoria Theatre, but left in September.

With James Belmore he opened in May 1843 the small City Theatre in part of Burdekin's huge ironmongery store on the corner of George and Market streets, but closed after a few weeks. He subsequently nominated for the parliamentary seat of Gloucester and Macquarie. The Empire newspaper ran a strong campaign against him, accusing him of hiding assets and declaring bankruptcy in an attempt to defraud creditors.

He returned to the Victoria where in August 1844 he presented his own play, The Duellist, "the first really original drama to be presented in tis colony", which was only performed twice.

In the same month he became owner of the Tavistock Hotel at the corner of King and York streets and there he gave free concerts three nights a week.

In June 1879, a benefit was given him at the Theatre Royal, where he played "Larry O'Gig" in The Robber's Wife and "Benjamin Bowbell" in The Illustrious Stranger, to popular acclaim.

He later taught Dramatic Art at his Academy at 87 William Street right up until his death.

He died in Sydney on 9 August 1893. A brief obituary was published in Melbourne's Jewish Herald.

== Family ==
Simmons was married to Nancy (1812–1860). Their children included:

- Sarah Simmons (1831–1874)
- James Simmons (1835–1898)
- Sophia Simmons (1846–1909)
- Jane Simmons (1851–1926)
