= Wide Bay–Burnett =

Coordinates: 25°25′0″S 152°42′0″E

- Region
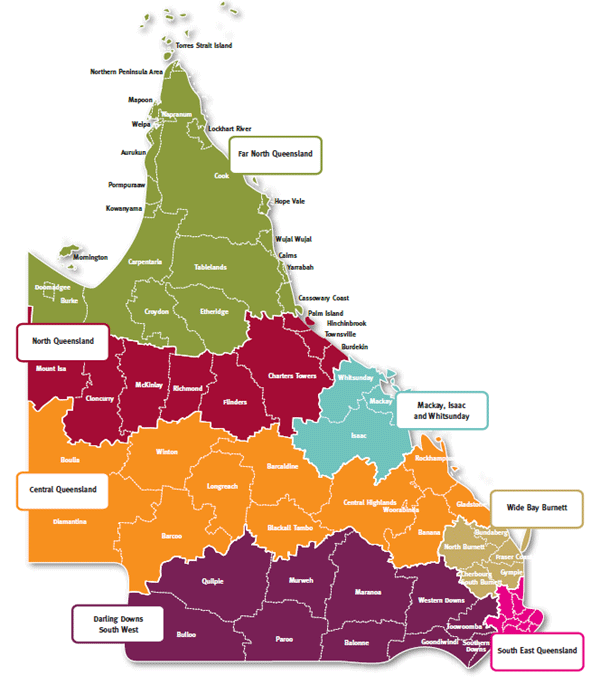
- Queensland Regions
- Country: Australia
- State: Queensland
- LGA: Bundaberg, Cherbourg, Fraser Coast, Gympie, North Burnett, South Burnett

Government
  - State electorate: Bundaberg, Burnett, Callide, Gympie, Maryborough, Nanango
  - Federal division: Wide Bay, Hinkler, Maranoa, Flynn

Area
  - Total: 48,598.4 km^{2} (18,763.9 sq mi)

Population
  - Total: 273,276 (2011 census)
  - Density: 5.623148/km^{2} (14.56389/sq mi)

Wide Bay–Burnett is a region of the Australian state of Queensland, located between 170–400 km (110–250 mi) north of the state capital, Brisbane. The area's population growth has exceeded the state average over the past 20 years, and it is forecast to grow to more than 430,000 by 2031. It is the subject of the Draft Wide Bay–Burnett Regional Plan, which aims to facilitate this growth while protecting over 90% of the region from urban development.

Wide Bay was the name given by the early European explorer James Cook to a coastal indentation as he was sailing past Double Island Point. As the Port of Maryborough developed during the 19th century Wide Bay became well known as ships passed through the area before entering the Great Sandy Strait and the port.

== Geography ==
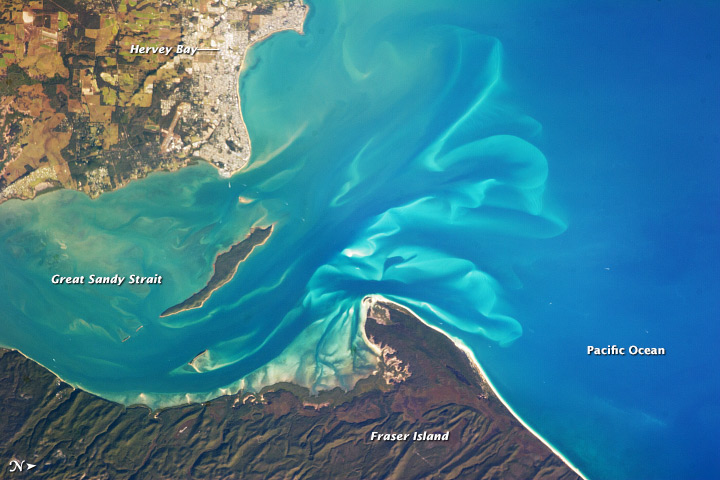
Hervey Bay and Great Sandy Strait from orbit

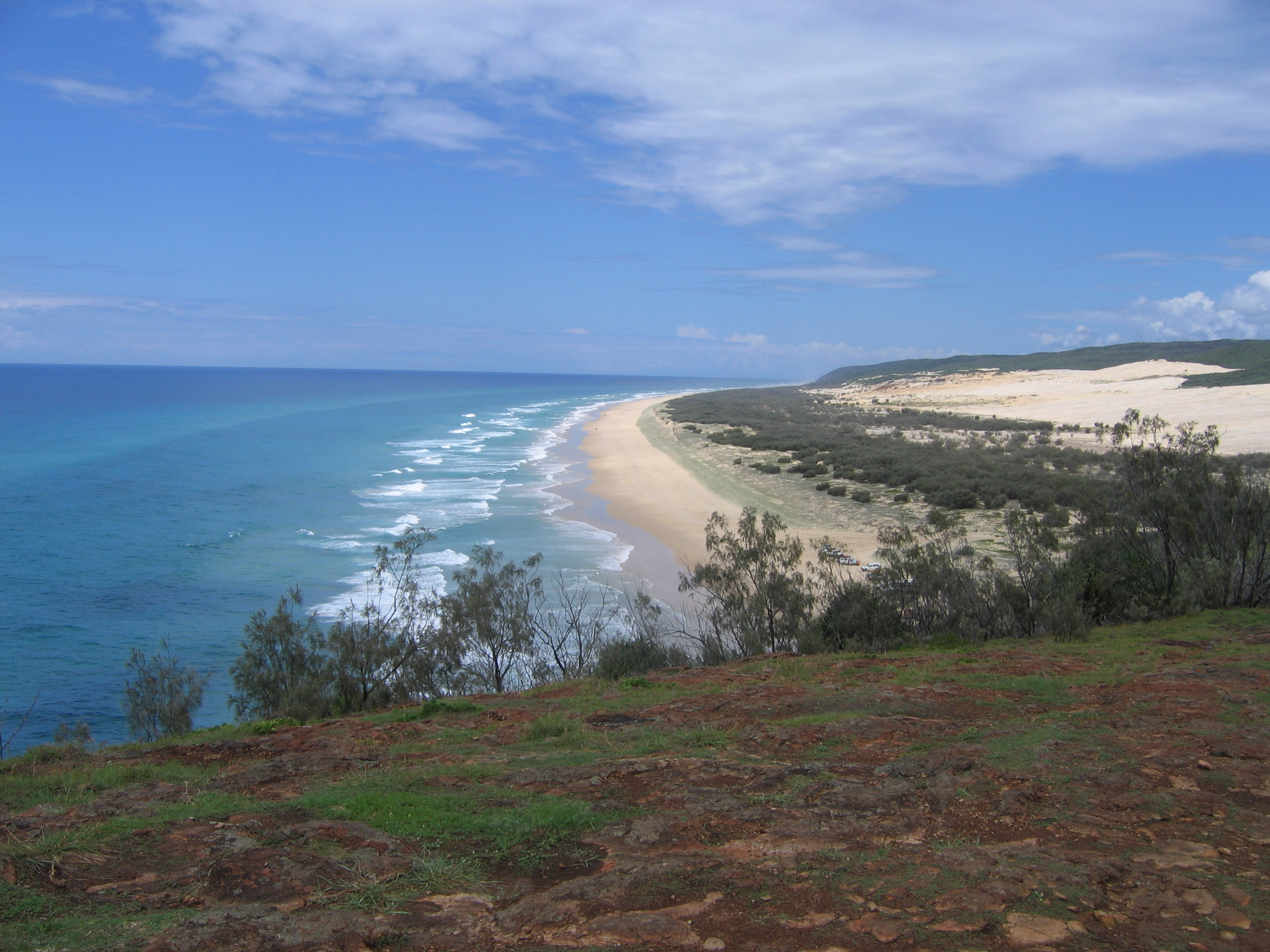
Fraser Island is the world's largest sand island

The coastal parts of the region are centered on the city of Maryborough. The inland is defined by a series of ranges which create the water of the Burnett River. In the southeast of the region is a coastal area known as Cooloola.

The Wide Bay–Burnett region consists of the following local government areas:

LGA	Population	Area
Bundaberg Region	96,936	6,449.2 km^{2} (2,490.1 sq mi)
Fraser Coast Region	102,080	7,116.7 km^{2} (2,747.8 sq mi)
Gympie Region	49,334	6,897.5 km^{2} (2,663.1 sq mi)
North Burnett Region	11,805	19,706.5 km^{2} (7,608.7 sq mi)
South Burnett Region	33,040	8,397.1 km^{2} (3,242.1 sq mi)
Aboriginal Shire of Cherbourg	1,260	31.7 km^{2} (12.2 sq mi)
Shire of Noosa^{[1]}	52,271	869.3 km^{2} (335.6 sq mi)

^{1} Noosa is sometimes included in the region, especially by tourism authorities, but is formally excluded by both the ABS and the Queensland Government's Department of Infrastructure and Planning.

=== K'gari ===
K'gari is located along the southern coast of Queensland, approximately 200 kilometres (120 mi) north of Brisbane. Its length is about 120 kilometres (75 mi) and its width is approximately 24 kilometres (15 mi) and it is separated from the mainland by the Great Sandy Strait. The island is considered to be the largest sand island in the world at 1840 km^{2}. It is also Queensland's largest island, Australia's sixth largest island and the largest island on the East Coast of Australia.

The island has rainforests, eucalyptus woodland, mangrove forests, wallum and peat swamps, sand dunes and coastal heaths. It is made up of sand that has been accumulating for approximately 750,000 years on volcanic bedrock that provides a natural catchment for the sediment which is carried on a strong offshore current northwards along the coast. K'gari is home to a small number of mammal species, as well as a diverse range of birds, reptiles and amphibians, including the occasional saltwater crocodile. The island is protected in the Great Sandy National Park.

=== South Burnett ===
The South Burnett is a peanut growing and wine-producing region on the western slopes of the Great Dividing Range, north of the Darling Downs. The Bunya Mountains mark the southern boundary of the region. 12 km from Murgon is the Bjelke-Petersen Dam. Other dams in the region include Gordonbrook Dam and Boondooma Dam. Tarong Power Station and the Tarong National Park are both in the south of the Burnett.

=== Cooloola ===
The area is dominated by the Cooloola sandmass. Fraser Island belong to the same sandmass. It once extended 30 km to the east when sea levels were lower than today. Large vegetated sand dunes have formed a varied terrain noted for its scientific importance. They contain the longest known chronosequence of coastal dunes in the world, covering 730,000 years. The area was once part of the Shire of Cooloola until 2008 when the Gympie Region expanded.

== History ==
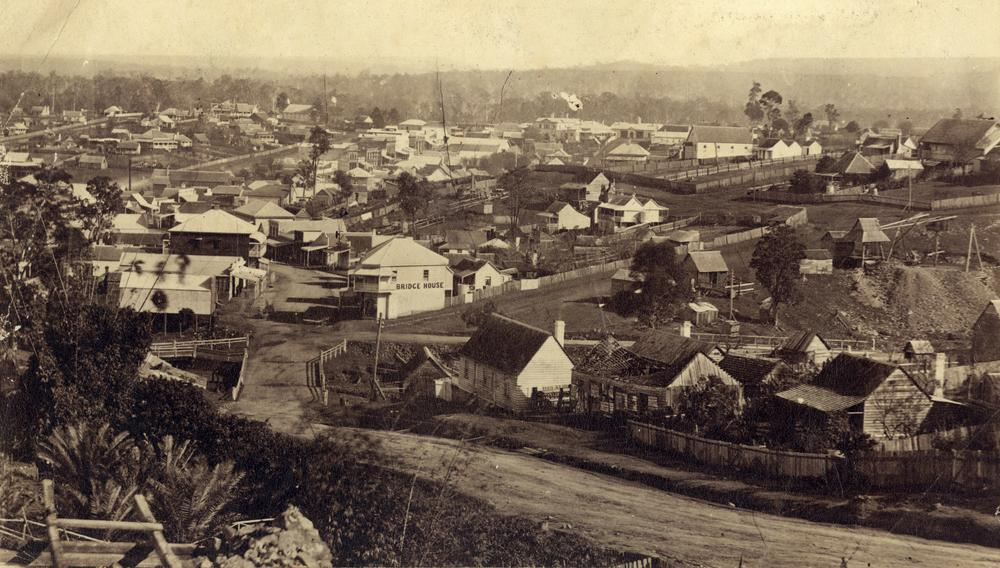
Gympie, 1905

Wakka Wakka (Waka Waka, Wocca Wocca, Wakawaka) is an Australian Aboriginal language spoken in the Burnett River catchment. The Wakka Wakka language region includes the landscape within the local government boundaries of the North and South Burnett Regional Councils, particularly the towns of Cherbourg, Murgon, Kingaroy, Gayndah, Eidsvold and Mundubbera.

James Nash reported the discovery of gold near Gympie on 16 October 1867. The railway from Maryborough completed in 1881 and the North Coast railway reached Gympie from Brisbane in 1891. Bundaberg was named and surveyed in 1870. In June 2000, a fire raged through a backpackers hostel, killing 15 backpackers. In January 2013, Cyclone Oswald brought severe weather and flooding to much of eastern Queensland. Its impact was most severe in the Wide Bay–Burnett region with Bundaberg particularly hard hit by both flooding and tornadoes. 4,000 properties were damaged.

=== Settlements ===
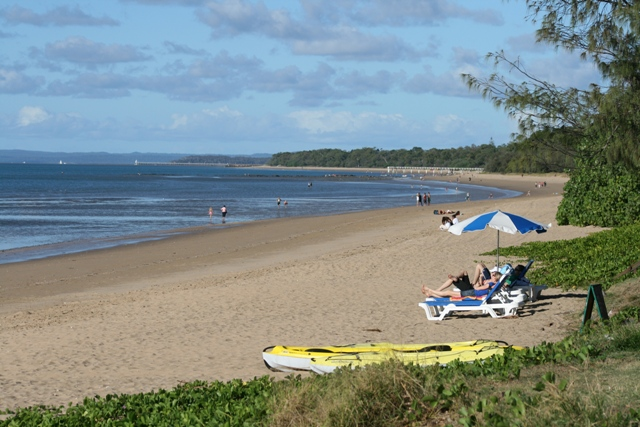
Beach at Hervey Bay, 2007

Cities in the region are Bundaberg, Gympie, Hervey Bay and Maryborough. Some of the more notable towns include Bargara, Biggenden, Blackbutt, Burnett Heads, Cherbourg, Childers, Eidsvold, Gayndah, Gin Gin, Howard, Imbil, Kilkivan, Kingaroy, Monto, Mundubbera, Murgon, Nanango, Rainbow Beach, Tin Can Bay and Wondai. The sheltered waters of Hervey Bay provide a unique playground for migrating humpback whales. The tourist industry has grown along with the number of whales, leading to Hervey Bay being called the whale watching capital of Australia.

== Education ==
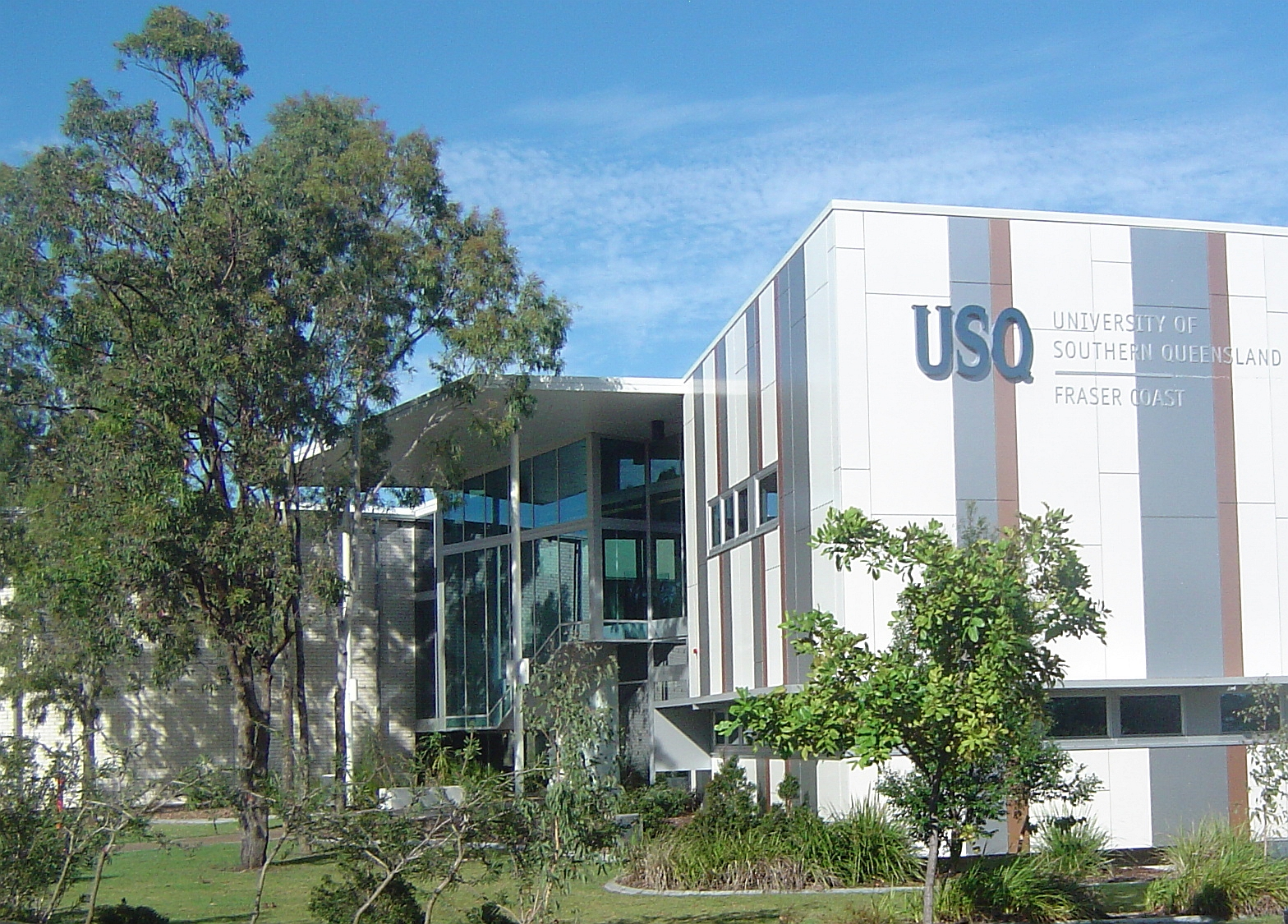
University of Southern Queensland's Fraser Campus, 2012

The region includes two universities: Central Queensland University at Bundaberg, and the University of Sunshine Coast's Fraser Campus at Hervey Bay. The Wide Bay Institute of TAFE operates from campuses at Bundaberg, Gympie, Hervey Bay and Maryborough, with the Maryborough campus . A campus of Southern Queensland Institute of TAFE is located at Kingaroy.

== Transport ==
The Wide Bay–Burnett region contains four large airports. These are Hervey Bay, Bundaberg, Maryborough and Kingaroy. Hervey Bay and Bundaberg airports are serviced by regular passenger flights.

The Bruce Highway links the region to Brisbane, Rockhampton, Townsville and Cairns, while the Burnett Highway and Isis Highway form part of an inland transport corridor to Toowoomba and central New South Wales.

Queensland Rail operates daily high-speed Tilt Train services to Gympie, Maryborough and Bundaberg. Public transport operated by Wide Bay Transit (Hervey Bay/Maryborough), Polleys Coaches (Gympie) and Duffy's City Buses (Bundaberg) connect at the railway stations. Public transport options for the inland areas are more limited, with buses linking the main towns to each other and Brisbane once a day, and once-weekly "shopper buses" in some towns.
