= Spanish Ladies =

Traditional British naval song

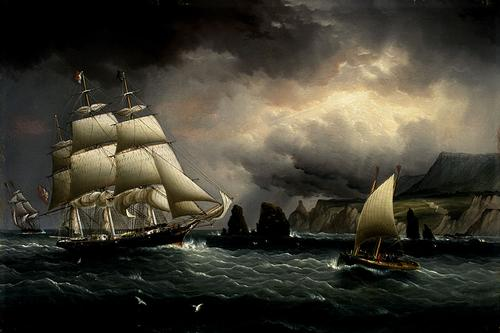
James E. Buttersworth's The Clipper Ship Flying Cloud off the Needles, Isle of Wight (1859–60)

"Spanish Ladies" (Roud 687) is a traditional British naval song, typically describing a voyage from Spain to the Downs from the viewpoint of ratings of the Royal Navy. Other prominent variants include an American variant called "Yankee Whalermen", an Australian variant called "Brisbane Ladies", and a Newfoundland variant called "The Ryans and the Pittmans".

== Origins ==
A broadside ballad by the name "Spanish Ladies" was registered in the English Stationer's Company on December 14, 1624. A version of the song from 1769 is included in a collection of songs written in a ship's logbook used by a number of vessels sailing from Dartmouth, Massachusetts under Peter Pease. This version is reported by the folk song scholar Roy Palmer to be the oldest text he has seen.

The song possibly gained in popularity during the Peninsular War when British soldiers were transported throughout the Iberian Peninsula to assist rebels fighting against the French occupation. After their victory over the Grande Armée, these soldiers were returned to Britain but forbidden to bring their Spanish wives, lovers, and children with them.

The song predates the proper emergence of the sea shanty. Shanties were the work songs of merchant sailors, rather than naval ones. However, in his 1840 novel Poor Jack, Captain Frederick Marryat reports that the song "Spanish Ladies"—though once very popular—was "now almost forgotten" and he included it in whole in order to "rescue it from oblivion". The emergence of shanties in the mid-19th century then revived its fortunes, to the point where it is now sometimes included as a "borrowed song" within the genre.

== Lyrics and music ==
Illustration for the song (Pamela Colman Smith, 1903). The women are stereotypical manolas, and the sailor is a Jack Tar.

"Spanish Ladies" is the story of British naval seamen sailing north from Spain and along the English Channel. The crew are unable to determine their latitude by sighting as the distance between Ushant to the south and the Scillies to the north is wide. Instead, they locate themselves by the depth and the sandy bottom they have sounded. Arthur Ransome, in his novel Peter Duck, suggests that the succession of headlands on the English shore indicates the ship tacking up-channel away from the French coast, identifying a new landmark on each tack. However, one verse (quoted below) states that they had the wind at southwest and squared their mainsails to run up the Channel, rather than beating against a northeasterly.

This is the text recorded in the 1840 novel Poor Jack. It is one of many. Notable variations are shown in parentheses after each line.

Farewell and adieu to you, Spanish ladies, (alt: "...to Spanish ladies" alt: "... to you fair Spanish Ladies")
Farewell and adieu to you, ladies of Spain; (alt: "...to ladies of Spain;" alt: "...to you ladies of Spain;")
For we have received orders (alt: "...'re under orders")
For to sail to old England, (alt: "To sail back to England")
But we hope in a short time to see you again. (alt: "And we may ne'er see you fair ladies again." alt: "And never to see you fine ladies again"))

(Chorus:)
We'll rant and we'll roar, like true British sailors,
We'll rant and we'll roar across the salt seas; (alt: "We'll range and we'll roam all on the salt seas;")
Until we strike soundings
In the Channel of old England,
From Ushant to Scilly 'tis thirty-five leagues. (alt: "34" or "45".)

Then we hove our ship to, with the wind at the sou'west, my boys, (alt: "We hove our ship to, with the wind from sou'west, boys")
Then we hove our ship to, for to strike soundings clear; (alt: "...deep soundings to take;" "...for to make soundings clear;")
Then we filled the main topsail (alt: "'Twas 45 (or 55) fathoms with a white sandy bottom")
And bore right away, my boys, (alt: "So we squared our main yard")
And straight up the Channel of old England did steer. (alt: "And up channel did make." or "...did steer")

So the first land we made, it is called the Deadman, (alt: "The first land we sighted was callèd the Dodman")
Next Ram Head, off Plymouth, Start, Portland, and the Wight; (alt: "Next Rame Head off Plymouth, Start, Portland, and Wight;")
We sailèd by Beachy, (alt: "We sailed by Beachy / by Fairlight and Dover")
By Fairly and Dungeness,
And then bore away for the South Foreland light. (alt: "Until we brought to for..." or "And then we bore up for...")

Now the signal it was made for the Grand Fleet to anchor (alt: "Then the signal was made...")
All in the Downs that night for to meet; (alt: "...that night for to lie;")
Then stand by your stoppers, (alt: "Let go your shank painter, / Let go your cat stopper")
See clear your shank painters,
Hawl all your clew garnets, stick out tacks and sheets. (alt: "Haul up your clewgarnets, let tack and sheets fly")

Now let every man take off his full bumper, (alt: "Now let ev'ry man drink off his full bumper")
Let every man take off his full bowl; (alt: "And let ev'ry man drink off his full glass;")
For we will be jolly (alt: "We'll drink and be jolly")
And drown melancholy,
With a health to each jovial and true hearted soul. (alt: "And here's to the health of each true-hearted lass.")

== Traditional recordings ==
Some traditional English performances of the song can be heard on the British Library Sound Archive:

- Walter Pardon, a Norfolk carpenter who had learnt it from a man who had in turn learnt it from a sailor
- Ron Fletcher of Gloucestershire who had first heard it sung by two old ladies in St. John's, Newfoundland and Labrador, while he was serving in World War II
- Harold Sykes of Hull, Yorkshire
- Edward Tise of Smarden, Kent

The folk song collectors Edith Fowke, Laura Boulton and Helen Creighton recorded versions from traditional singers in Canada, particularly in Nova Scotia.

Helen Hartness Flanders recorded a man named William J. Thompson of Canaan, Vermont, US, singing "Gay Spanish Ladies", which can be heard online courtesy of the Helen Hartness Flanders Collection.

== Variants ==
The song has been found in several different minor and major keys. Cecil Sharp considered the minor key version to be the "original". The song has been localized to many different regions, usually with the phrase 'British sailors' in the first line of the chorus being substituted to another local identity. "Yankee Whalermen" is a prominent American variant, which is in a major mode and describes whalers instead of navy sailors. "Brisbane Ladies" is an Australian variant, about drovers instead of sailors. A significantly modified version called "The Ryans and the Pittmans", widely known as "We'll Rant and We'll Roar like True Newfoundlanders", is a traditional song from Newfoundland, Canada.

== Other recordings ==
- A version was created especially for the Bluenose, a famed Canadian ship based in Nova Scotia.
- Great Big Sea recorded the Newfoundland variant "Rant and Roar" on their 1995 album Up.
- David Coffin recorded "Yankee Whalermen" for his 2000 album David Coffin & the Nantucket Sleighride.
- The H.P. Lovecraft Historical Society recorded a rewritten version, "Undying Ladies", for their 2016 album titled The Curious Sea Shanties of Innsmouth Massachusetts.
- "Spanish Ladies" was recorded by the American quintet Bounding Main and released on their 2016 album Fish Out of Water.
- The Longest Johns recorded a version of it for their album Between Wind and Water (2018).

== In other media ==
The song forms part of Sir Henry J. Wood's 1905 composition Fantasia on British Sea Songs.

As mentioned above, the song is quoted in full in the 1840 novel Poor Jack. It appears in part in the 40th chapter of Herman Melville's Moby-Dick and in chapter 7 of Post Captain, the 2nd book and in Treason's Harbour, the 9th book of Patrick O'Brian's Aubrey–Maturin series of novels set during the Napoleonic Wars. It also appears in Arthur Ransome's books Swallows and Amazons and Missee Lee and Wilbur Smith's works Monsoon and Blue Horizon.

The "Yankee Whalerman" variant of the song appeared in the 1975 film Jaws, sung by the shark hunter Quint (portrayed by Robert Shaw). It was also sung in the 2003 film Master and Commander: The Far Side of the World, based on the O'Brian books.

Robert Shaw, the actor who sang the tune in Jaws, also sang it years earlier in a 1956 episode of the television show The Buccaneers. It has also appeared in the series Homicide, Hornblower, Jimmy Neutron, The Mentalist, Gossip Girl, Monsuno, and Turn.

A variation called "The Spanish Bride" was written and recorded by John Tams for the TV series Sharpe, with the lyrics changed to reflect British soldiers returning home at the end of the Peninsular War.

The video games Assassin's Creed IV: Black Flag and Assassin's Creed: Rogue feature "Spanish Ladies" as one of the collectible sea shanties that the sailors on the player's ship may begin singing while sailing between islands while out of combat.

Australian singer-songwriter Sarah Blasko produced a cover of the song which featured in the series Turn: Washington's Spies.
