= HMS Brissenden =

British naval ship

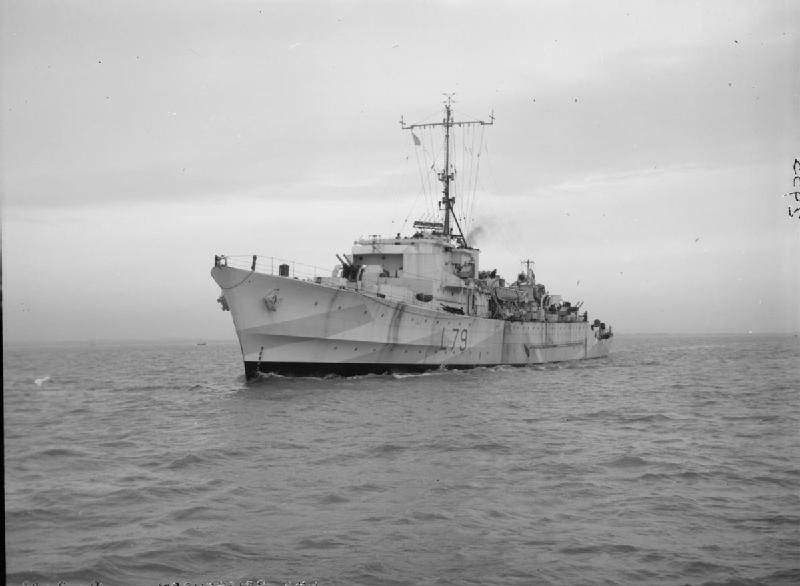

History

United Kingdom
- Name: HMS Brissenden
- Ordered: 28 July 1940
- Builder: John I. Thornycroft & Company, Woolston
- Laid down: 28 February 1941
- Launched: 15 September 1942
- Commissioned: 12 February 1943
- Identification: Pennant number: L79
- Fate: Sold for scrap 18 February 1965

General characteristics
- Class & type: Type IV Hunt-class destroyer
- Displacement: 1,070 long tons (1,090 t) standard; 1,590 long tons (1,620 t) full load
- Length: 296 ft (90.2 m) o/a
- Beam: 9.6 m (31 ft 6 in)
- Draught: 2.36 m (7 ft 9 in)
- Propulsion: 2 Admiralty 3-drum boilers; 2 shaft Parsons geared turbines, 19,000 shp (14,000 kW)
- Speed: 27 knots (31 mph; 50 km/h)
- Complement: 170
- Armament: 6 × QF 4 in Mark XVI guns on twin mounts; 4 × QF 2 pdr Mk. VIII on quad mount; 8 × 20 mm Oerlikons on twin mounts; 3 × 21-inch (533 mm) torpedo tubes; 50 depth charges, 5 throwers, 2 chutes

HMS Brissenden was a Type IV Hunt-class destroyer of the British Royal Navy. The Type IV Hunts were built to a design by Thornycroft rather than the Admiralty design of Type I to III Hunts, but like them were small destroyers intended to be intermediate between slow sloops and large fleet destroyers. Brissenden was built by Thornycroft at their Woolston, Southampton between 1941 and 1943, completing on 12 February 1943.

Brissenden was mainly employed in convoy escort duties and patrols in British waters and the English Channel during the Second World War but also took part in the Allied invasion of Sicily in July 1943, and the Invasion of Normandy in June 1944. Following the end of the war, Brissenden served in the Mediterranean Sea, where she was employed in patrols off Mandatory Palestine, intercepting ships carrying Jewish immigrants until December 1947. The destroyer was laid up in reserve in June 1948 and was sold for scrap in February 1965.

== Design and construction ==
The Type IV Hunt-class destroyers evolved from a 1938 proposal by Thornycroft for a small destroyer, intermediate between large fleet destroyers and slower sloops. Thornycroft developed its proposal independently from the British Admiralty's own requirements for an intermediate destroyer, and was rejected by the Admiralty, which ordered its own design, the Type I Hunt. Thornycroft resubmitted a revised design in 1940, and after further revision in response to comments from the Admiralty and Stanley Goodall, the Director of Naval Construction, Thornycroft's design was accepted. Two examples of Thornycroft's design, Brecon and Brissenden were ordered on 28 July 1940.

The Type IV Hunts differed considerably from the Admiralty design, being longer and having an extended forecastle to allow access to all guns from under cover. They were 296 ft (90.2 m) long overall, 283 ft (86.3 m) long at the waterline and 276 ft (84.1 m) long between perpendiculars. The ship's beam was 33 ft 3 in (10.1 m) at the waterline, while draught was 10 ft (3.0 m) at deep load. Displacement was 1,070 long tons (1,087 t) standard and 1,590 long tons (1,616 t) under full load. Two Admiralty boilers raising steam at 300 pounds per square inch (2,100 kPa) and 620 °F (327 °C) fed Parsons single-reduction geared steam turbines that drove two propeller shafts, generating 19,000 shaft horsepower (14,000 kW) at 380 rpm. This gave a design maximum speed of 27 knots (50 km/h; 31 mph) (corresponding to 25 knots (46 km/h; 29 mph) at full load). Unlike sister ship Brecon, Brissenden was not fitted with stabilizers, allowing fuel capacity to be increased from 286 long tons (291 t) to 352 long tons (358 t). The Type IV Hunts carried a crew of 170 officers and other ranks.

Main gun armament was six 4-inch (102 mm) QF Mk XVI dual purpose (anti-ship and anti-aircraft) guns in three twin mounts, one forward and two aft, with a quadruple 2-pounder "pom-pom" and eight Oerlikon 20 mm cannon (four twin mounts) providing close-in anti-aircraft fire. A single 2-pounder gun was later mounted on the ship's bow for dealing with enemy motor torpedo boats. Three 21-inch (533 mm) torpedo tubes were fitted in a single triple mount, while two depth charge chutes, four depth charge throwers and 50 depth charges comprised the ship's anti-submarine armament. Type 286 target indication radar was mounted on the ship's masthead, with Type 285 radar fitted to the High Angle director, while Type 271 radar was later fitted.

Brissenden was laid down at Thornycroft's shipyard at Woolston, Southampton on 28 February 1941, as yard number 1291. The ship was launched on 15 September 1942 and completed on 12 February 1943. Brissenden was named after a fox hunt in Kent, and was the first ship with that name to be built for the Royal Navy. She was allocated the pennant number L79.

== Service ==
On commissioning, Brissenden joined the Home Fleet, carrying out escort duties. Brissenden took part in Operation Husky, the Allied invasion of Sicily in July 1943. She formed part of the escort (Escort Group V) of assault convoy KMF 18 from Bône in Algeria, which arrived off in the invasion beaches on 10 July. Brissenden then provided bombardment support for the advancing troops. On 11 July, when Canadian troops were held up by defences near the town of Pozzallo, the defences were shelled, and white flags were seen to be flown. A landing party from Brissenden and the destroyer Blankney took the surrender of the town. Early on the next day, Brissenden and Blankney collided when on anti-submarine patrol. Brissenden was badly damaged, with a deep cut on her port bow, with one man killed and another four injured. Brissenden returned to the United Kingdom for repairs, which were carried out at Liverpool between 21 August and 2 October 1943.

After repair, Brissenden joined the 15th Destroyer Flotilla, based at Plymouth. On 10 November 1943, Brissenden joined the escort for the return Arctic Convoy RA 54A on the final leg of its journey to Loch Ewe, and from 15 November to 18 November, escorted the eastbound Convoy JW 54A on the first leg of its journey to Russia. From 5 to 9 December 1943, Brissenden joined the escort of Convoy RA 54B, again on its final leg. Early on 17 January 1944, Brissensen and the destroyer Talybont were escorting the westbound convoy PW.461 when the convoy came under attack by seven E-boats of the 5th Schnellboot-Flotille, and managed to fight off the attack, with no damage to the convoy, despite 11 torpedoes being launched against it.

While the 15th Destroyer Flotilla's main role was defending coastal convoys against E-boat attack, the flotilla was also required to take part in Operation Tunnel, a series of sweeps along the coast of Brittany to intercept German shipping. On the night of 19/20 January 1944, Brissenden was one of seven destroyers (Note: Tanatside, Brissenden, Talybont, Ashanti, HMCS Athabaskan, Haida and Iroquois.) that took part in one such sweep, with no contact made with enemy shipping. On the night of 4/5 February 1944, Brissenden, together with Tanatside, Talybont and Wensleydale were carrying out another Operation Tunnel patrol when they encountered the German minesweepers M156 and M206, escorted by the torpedo boat T29, off Île Vierge. The British destroyers hit M156 eight times with 4-inch shells, knocking out the minesweeper's engines and immobilising her, but the British ships broke off the engagement when signals intelligence indicated that E-boats were about to attack. This allowed M156 to be towed into Aber Wrac'h, but the minesweeper was bombed and sunk by Hawker Typhoon fighter-bombers of No. 266 Squadron RAF the next morning. On the night of 15/16 March 1944, 10 E-boats set out to intercept a convoy north of Lands End, but were detected by a Handley Page Halifax of No. 502 Squadron RAF. Brissenden and Melbreak formed one of several groups ordered to intercept the E-boats, and found the German force south west of Wolf Rock. One of the E-boats, S143, was damaged by the British destroyers in the resulting action. From June 1944, Brissenden took part in the Normandy landings, and on 6 June, escorted a follow up convoy after the initial landings. On the night of 12/13 June, Brissenden, together with Melbreak and Wensleydale clashed with a group of E-boats. On the night of 22/23 June, Brissenden was unsuccessfully attacked by German bombers.

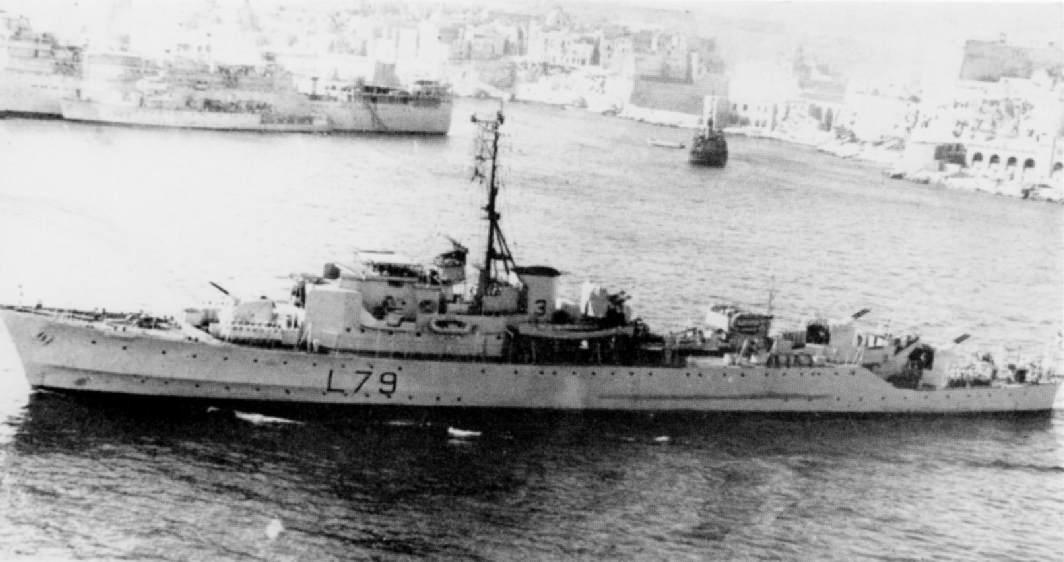
Brissenden

After support for operations in Normandy were completed, Brissenden returned to the 15th Destroyer Flotilla. On 25 October 1944, Brissenden and Tanatside intercepted and sank a small tanker and a trawler that were on passage between the German bases at La Pallice and St. Nazaire, with the tanker carrying fuel for U-boats. The ship was refitted at Pembroke Dockyard between 5 December 1944 and 1 February 1945. After the refit, Brissenden joined the 21st Destroyer Flotilla based at Sheerness. On 13 March 1945, Brissenden and Albrighton attacked a suspected German midget submarine in the North Sea east of Clacton on Sea.

After the end of the fighting in Europe, Brissenden was transferred to the Mediterranean to serve as a reserve for the East Indies Station, remaining in the Mediterranean after VJ Day. The destroyer joined the 3rd Destroyer Flotilla, and was employed on patrols off the coast of Mandatory Palestine. On 11 August 1946, Brissenden intercepted the schooner Yagur, carrying illegal Jewish immigrants to Palestine, and arrested Yagur in Haifa Bay. Brissenden boarded a second sailing ship on 13 August and towed her into Haifa.

Brissenden continued as part of the 3rd Destroyer Flotilla until December 1947. On 19 June 1948, Brissenden was reduced to Category A2 Reserve (Note: Ships in Category A2 Reserve were maintained but would require a refit to bring them up to 14 day readiness.) at Portsmouth, and in 1953 moved to Lisahally in Northern Ireland where she was kept in Class II Reserve. (Note: Ships in Class II reserve kept at 30 days readiness for service.) In 1958, there were plans to sell Brissenden to Kuwait for conversion to a Royal yacht, but the sale did not occur. In June 1962, Brissenden was placed on the Sales List, and was sold for scrap to Arnott Young & Co. of Glasgow on 18 February 1965 for £29,000. The ship was towed to Dalmuir for scraspping, arriving their on 3 March that year.
