= Impressment =

Forced conscription with violence

Impressment, colloquially "the press" or the "press gang", is a type of conscription of people into a military force, especially a naval force, via intimidation and physical coercion, conducted by an organized group (hence "gang"). The navies of several European nations used various means of impressment starting in the late 16th century and continuing into the 19th century. The large size of the British Royal Navy in the Age of Sail meant that impressment was most commonly associated with Great Britain and Ireland. It was used by the Royal Navy in wartime, beginning in 1664 and during the 18th and early 19th centuries, as a means of crewing warships, although legal sanction for the practice can be traced back to the time of Edward I of England.

The Royal Navy impressed many merchant sailors, as well as some sailors from other, mostly European, nations. People liable to impressment were "eligible men of seafaring habits between the ages of 18 and 55 years". Non-seamen were sometimes impressed as well, though rarely. In addition to the Royal Navy's use of impressment, the British Army also experimented with impressment from 1778 to 1780. Impressment was strongly criticised by those who believed it to be contrary to the British constitution. Though the public opposed conscription in general, impressment was repeatedly upheld by the courts, as it was deemed vital to the strength of the navy and, by extension, to the survival of the British realm and influence. Impressment was essentially a Royal Navy practice, reflecting the sheer size of the British fleet and its substantial manpower demands. While other European navies utilized forms of forced recruitment in times of war, it was generally an extension of their formal conscription practices applied during the Napoleonic Wars and onwards.

The impressment of seamen from American ships caused serious tensions between Britain and the Thirteen Colonies in the years leading up to the Revolutionary War. One of the 27 colonial grievances enumerated in the Declaration of Independence directly highlights the practice: "He has constrained our fellow Citizens taken Captive on the high Seas to bear Arms against their Country, to become the executioners of their friends and Brethren, or to fall themselves by their Hands." It was again a cause of tension leading up to the War of 1812.

== Origins ==
During the feudal period, all men were expected to defend the realm when called upon, and impressment was a normal practice in the navies and the armies of medieval Europe. In England, in the early part of the 17th century, ideas about personal liberty and the limited power of the state began to develop, and by the time the Civil War erupted in 1642, the impressment of soldiers had already been abolished. Parliament however, considered the navy too valuable to make similar concessions for sailors. Further revolutions in 1649, 1660 and 1688 did nothing to change that with successive regimes arriving at the same conclusion.

Army recruitment in England from that point, relied entirely upon volunteers, who received a bounty. Certain criminals were also permitted to join, in return for a pardon. A limited form of impressment in the British Army was briefly reintroduced in 1778 but only for men who were not in lawful employment and who had no substance sufficient for their support and maintenance. Additionally, they had to be fit and able-bodied, between the ages of 17 and 45, and over 5’4” in height. The act was amended the following year to include men who had abandoned their families and left them to the mercy of the parish. The age and height restrictions were also changed to between 16 and 50, and over 5’3”. However, the acts were repealed in May 1780. The acts also improved pay and conditions for volunteers, which was not repealed.

As Britain grew into a world power, its navy became more important. The demands placed on it to protect trade and the colonies led to a massive increase in the number of ships, which had to be manned. Alternatives to impressment were tried, but none were as effective, and so it continued despite the prevalent conception of liberty among the British people. "The press", as it was often shortened to, was therefore universally disliked. Even the authorities were hostile; local councillors would often refuse to ratify press warrants, judges and juries repeatedly acquitted men under trial for murder because they had justifiably resisted the invasion of their personal liberties by press-gangs, and the Admiralty thought the whole process inefficient.

Before 1778, Royal Navy captains were responsible for recruiting their own crews, including by impressment when necessary. This burden was lessened somewhat, shortly before the outbreak of the American Revolutionary War, when the Comptroller of the Navy, Sir Charles Middleton, introduced the Impress Service.

== Royal Navy recruiting and desertion ==
Working and living conditions for the average sailor in the Royal Navy in the 18th century were very harsh by modern standards. For major voyages, shipowners and governments routinely estimated that 50 percent of the sailors would die due to scurvy. Naval pay was attractive in the 1750s, but towards the end of the century its value had been steadily eroded by rising prices. Sailors' pay on merchant ships was somewhat higher during peacetime, and it could increase to double naval pay during wartime. (Note: During the 18th century, a Royal Navy Able Seaman was paid (after deductions) 22 shillings and 6 pence per month. Pay was reckoned by the 28-day lunar month, so the annual rate of pay was somewhat more than 12 times this. A farm worker of the era might earn around only a quarter to a third of this. Wages on merchant ships were higher: 25 to 30 shillings per lunar month – and increased further during wartime (merchant pay rates of 70 shillings per month at London and 35 shillings at Bristol were offered during the Seven Years' War). But merchant crews could be cheated of their pay in several ways by dishonest shipowners.)

Until 19th-century reforms improved conditions, the Royal Navy was additionally known to pay wages up to two years in arrears. The Navy always withheld six months' pay as a standard policy, in order to discourage desertion. Naval wages had been set in 1653, and were not increased until April 1797 after sailors on 80 ships of the Channel Fleet based at Spithead mutinied.

Despite this, there were still many volunteers for naval service. The work for individual sailors was less than on merchant ships, since the naval crew size was determined by the number needed to man guns – around four times more than the number of crew needed to simply sail the ship. Furthermore, the food supplied by the Navy was plentiful, regular, and of good quality by the standards of the day. In the late 18th and early 19th centuries, it was not at all unusual for impressed men to view life in the navy, hard though it was, as still preferable to their previous lives on shore, and to volunteer for further service when the opportunity came to leave the ship.

The main problem with naval recruitment was a shortage of qualified and experienced seamen during wartime; for example, when the Navy had to quickly recruit an extra 20,000 men in the early 18th century, and 40,000 men in the late 18th century. Privateers, the Royal Navy, and the Merchant Navy all competed for a small pool of ordinary and able seamen in wartime, and all three groups were usually short-handed. The recruitment figures presented to Parliament for the years 1755–1757 list 70,566 men, which included both pressed men and volunteers. The impressment service was responsible for raising 36,963 of those, of which 16,953 were pressed men and 20,370 were listed as volunteers.

Although there are no records that explain why volunteers were separated into two groups, it is likely these were pressed men who became "volunteers" to get the sign-up bonus, two months' wages in advance and a higher wage. It is known that large numbers did this. Volunteering also protected the sailor from creditors, as the law forbade collecting debts accrued before enlistment. A disadvantage was that volunteers who deserted were liable to execution if captured, although this threat was rarely carried out, whereas pressed men were simply returned to service. There was, however, very little difference in the percentage of desertions from the two groups, and some pressed men who had initially petitioned for release had elected to remain in the service by the time their case was heard. Other records confirm similar percentages throughout the 18th century.

Average annual recruitment, 1736–1783
| Dates | Period | Royal Navy | Privateer | Merchant | Total |
|---|---|---|---|---|---|
| 1736–1738 | Peacetime | 14,845 | | 35,239 | 50,084 |
| 1739–1748 | War of Jenkins' Ear | 43,303 | 2,602 | 30,392 | 76,297 |
| 1753–1755 | Peacetime | 17,369 | | 40,862 | 58,231 |
| 1756–1763 | Seven Years' War | 74,771 | 3,286 | 37,584 | 115,641 |
| 1773–1775 | Peacetime | 18,540 | | 50,903 | 69,443 |
| 1775–1783 | American Revolutionary War | 67,747 | 3,749 | 44,947 | 116,443 |

All three groups also suffered high levels of desertion. In the 18th century, British desertion rates on naval ships averaged 25% annually, with a slight difference between volunteers and pressed men. For example, the frigate HMS Hermione, with a regular complement of 180 men, had 129 desertions between 1793 and 1797. Desertion rates for Dutch and French warships were even higher, with annual rates of up to 90% not uncommon. In 1795, the Dutch vessel Staaten Generaal, with a complement of 550, lost 428 to desertion; the Delft, with 350 men, lost 340. The rate of desertion started high, then fell heavily after a few months on board a ship, and generally became negligible after a year—because Navy pay ran months or years in arrears, desertion might mean not only abandoning companions in the ship's company, but also the right to collect a large amount of backpay that had already been earned. If a naval ship had taken a prize, a deserting seaman would forfeit his share of the prize money. In a report on proposed changes to the Royal Navy written by Admiral Nelson in 1803, he noted that since 1793 more than 42,000 sailors had deserted.

== The Impress Service and impressment at sea ==
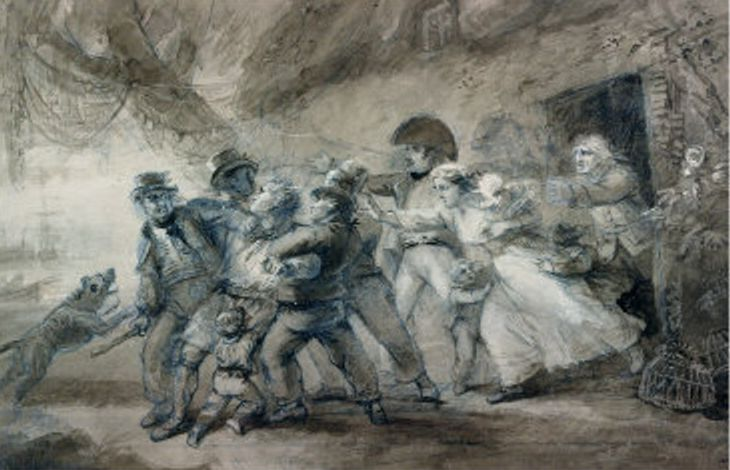
The Press-gang, oil painting by Luke Clennell

The Impress Service was a permanent shore-based organisation with three main functions: to recruit volunteers, to press men into service, and to control desertion by rounding up stragglers and drunks who were already serving in the Navy. There was no concept of "joining the navy" as a fixed career path for non-officers at the time, since seamen remained attached to a ship only for the duration of its commission. They were encouraged to stay in the Navy after the commission but could leave to seek other employment when the ship was paid off. Impressment relied on the legal power of the King to call men to military service, as well as to recruit volunteers, who were paid a bounty upon joining, unlike pressed men. Seamen were not covered by the Magna Carta and "failure to allow oneself to be pressed" was initially punishable by hanging, although the punishment became less severe over time.

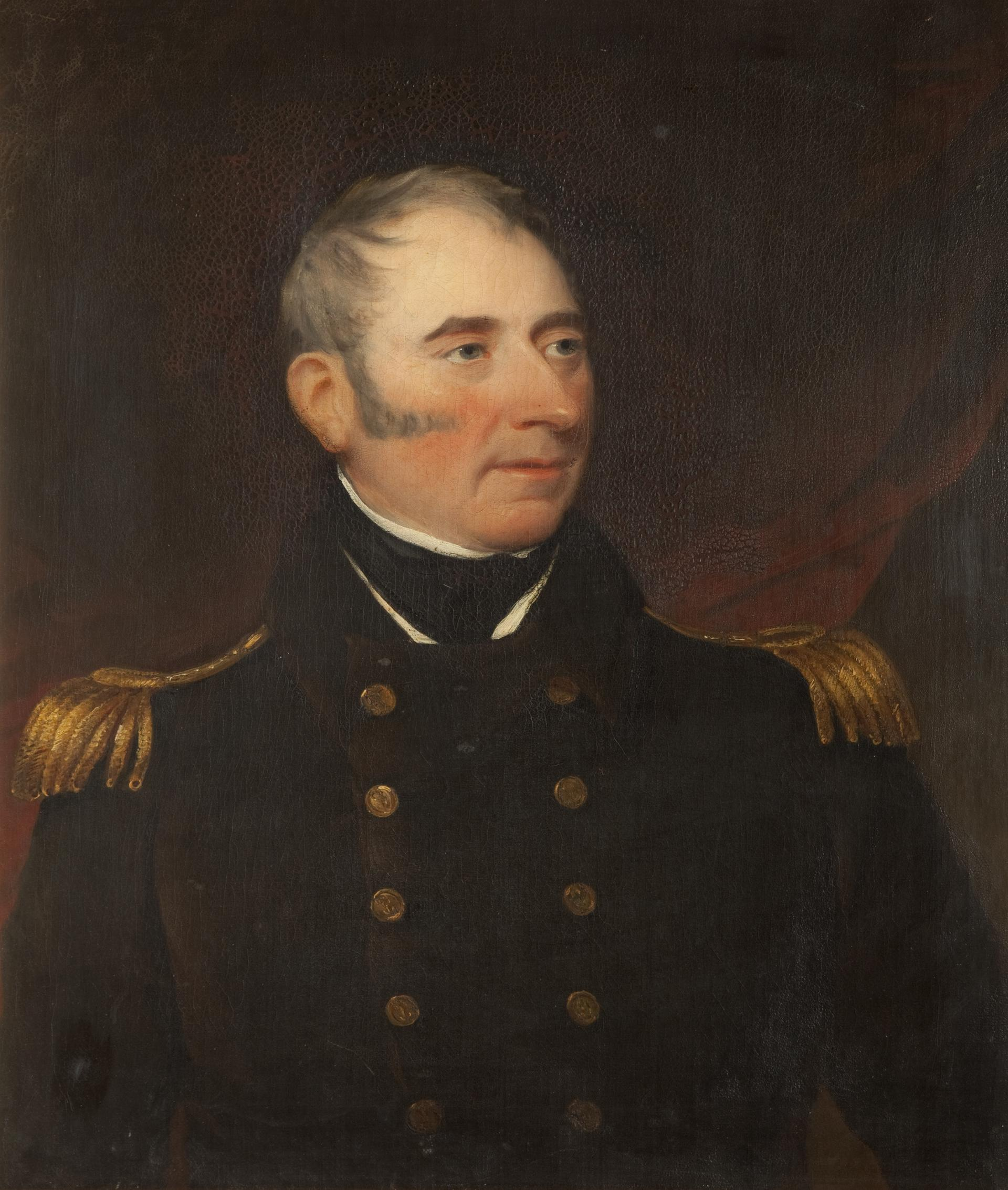
Captain John Quilliam RN. Quilliam was impressed into the Royal Navy in 1794. Unlike most impressed sailors, Quilliam rose rapidly in the Royal Navy and by 1797 had attained the rank of midshipman. He served with distinction at the Battle of Trafalgar, as first lieutenant on HMS Victory, before being promoted to the rank of captain and serving on the Newfoundland Station. He retired from the Royal Navy in 1815.

In Elizabethan times a statute regulated impressment as a form of recruitment, and with the introduction of the Vagabonds Act 1597 (39 Eliz. 1. c. 4), men of disrepute (vagrants) found themselves drafted into service. The Navigation Act 1703 (2 & 3 Ann. c. 6) limited the impressment of boys under 18 years of age to those who were not apprenticed. The Exemption from Impressment Act 1739 (13 Geo. 2. c. 17) raised the maximum age to 55. Although no foreigner could normally be pressed, they lost their protection if they married a British woman or had worked on a British merchant ship for two years. Some governments, including Britain, issued "protections" against impressment that protected men had to carry on their person at all times, but in times of crisis the Admiralty would order a "hot press", which meant that no one remained exempt.

The Royal Navy also impressed seamen from inbound British merchant ships at sea, though this was done by individual warships, rather than by the Impress Service. Impressment, particularly press gangs, became consistently unpopular with the British public (as well as in the American colonies) and ran the risk of physical assault. In one incident during the Third Anglo-Dutch War, one press gang leader, working in the fishing ports of Mousehole and Newlyn in Cornwall, wrote that "[he was] going home at night when three or four of them [Mousehole men] fell on me, and with clubs beat and abused me, and endeavoured to throw me over a great high cliff, and had a rope with them ready to hang me, and tore all my cloak in pieces"; after managing to escape this, he then "immediately repaired to a notary, and gave out my warrants, and then sent my servant purposely with my horse to Newlyn to the constable with my warrant to impress seamen. The town seeing my horse, fell on my man and knocked him off, broke his head, and threw him over cliff, that he was taken up dead, so that for the present go no further with the other warrants."

== Basis ==
At the time of the Battle of Trafalgar in 1805, over half the Royal Navy's 120,000 sailors were pressed men. The power of the Impress Service to conscript was limited by law to seafarers, including merchant seamen, longshoremen, collier crews and fishermen. There is little basis to the popular conception that civilians without any seafaring background were randomly seized from home, country lane or workplace by press gangs or that the latter were employed inland away from coastal ports; notably Portsmouth, Plymouth, Harwich and Yarmouth. However, convicted petty criminals were often given the option of volunteering for naval service as unskilled "quota men" by parish constables and inland courts.

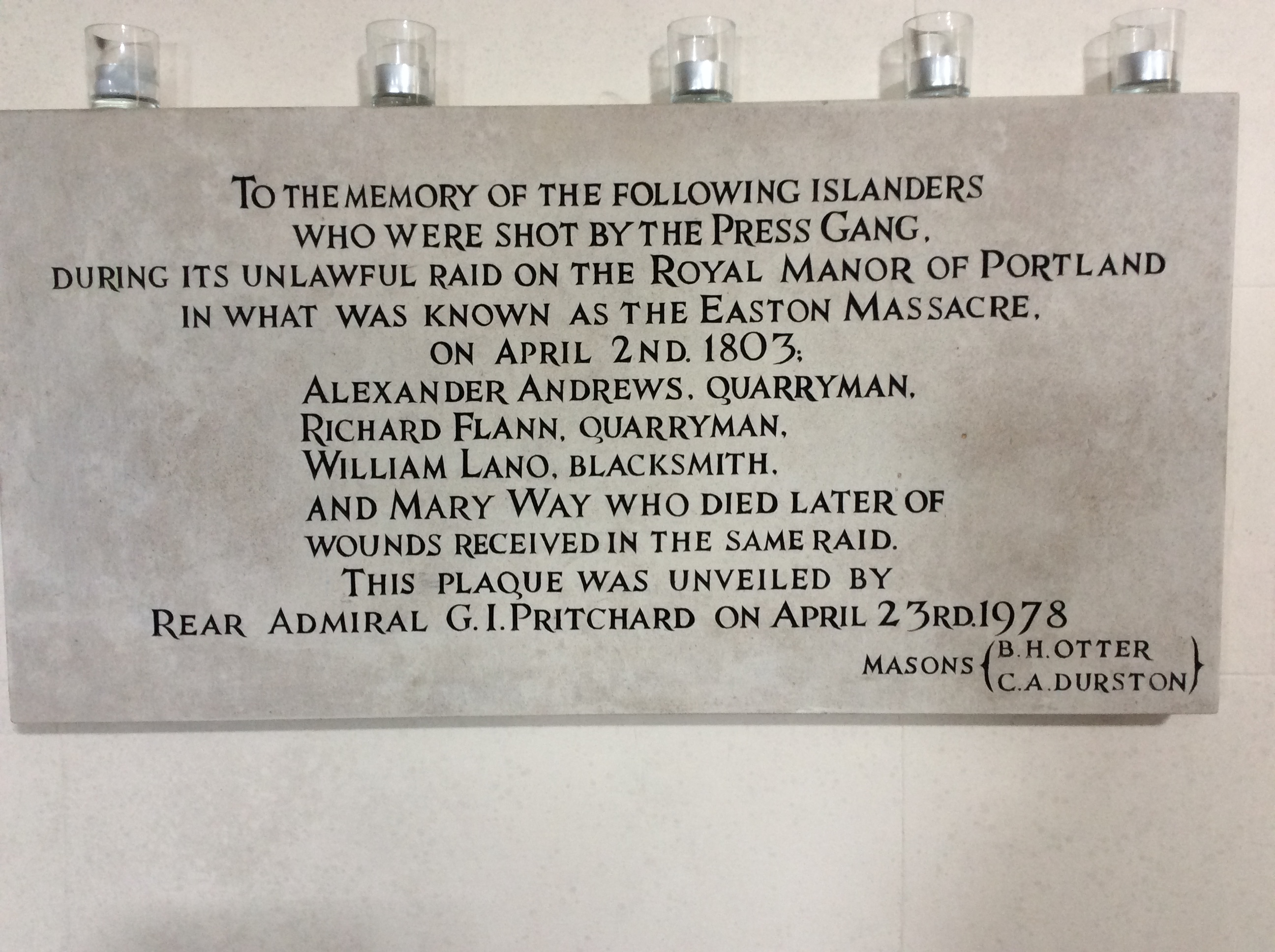
This tablet commemorates the Admiralty's apology for the killing of two quarrymen (Alexander Andrews and Rick Flann) and one blacksmith (William Lano), during an illegal attempt to impress them on the Isle of Portland in Dorset on 2 April 1803. A young lady, Mary Way, died later from her wounds. The illegality of the raid was confirmed in the London and local courts.

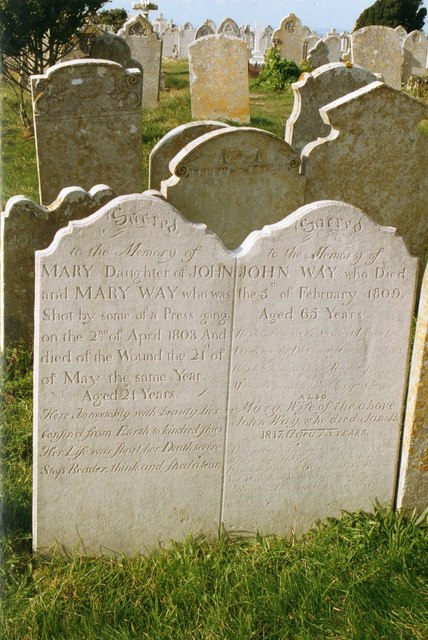
Grave of Mary Way, shot by press-gangers during anti-impressment demonstrations

There were occasions when the local populace would band together to oppose the activities of the press where these exceeded legal bounds. One such incident, the Easton Massacre in 1803 (see caption at right), resulted in a press gang firing on a crowd of protesters and killing four people in the village of Easton on the Isle of Portland, where they were trying to impress the quarrymen.

In 1808, Thomas Urquhart was saved from a press gang of three or four men when one or more London passersby intervened. Urquhart complained to local officials, identified at least one of the men involved and successfully sued for damages in the Court of King's Bench. He went on to lobby for changes in law and practice, publishing Letters on the evils of impressment: with the outline of a plan for doing them away, on which depend the wealth, prosperity, and consequence of Great Britain in 1816.

Patrolling in or near sea ports, the press gang would try to find men aged between 15 and 55 with seafaring or river boat experience, but this was not essential. Potential crewmen with no experience were called "landsmen". From 1740, landsmen were legally exempt from impressment; however, this exemption was occasionally ignored during wartime unless the person seized was an apprentice or a "gentleman". Ship captains generally considered two landsmen equivalent to one able seaman. If a landsman was able to prove his status to the Admiralty, he was usually released. Court records do, however, show fights breaking out as people attempted to avoid what was perceived as wrongful impressment. The Times reported occasions when press gangs instituted a "hot press" (ignoring protections against impressment) in order to man the Navy.

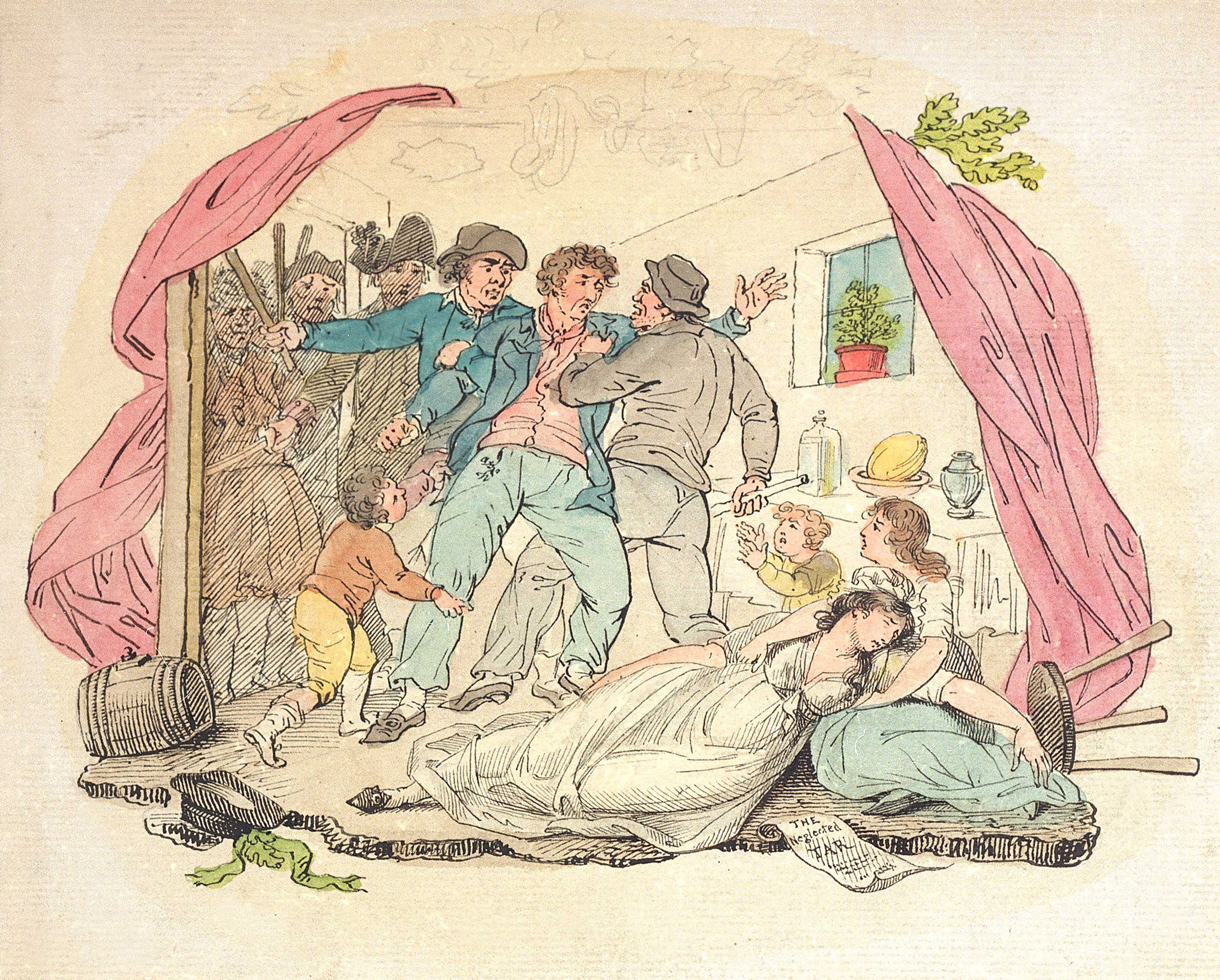
The Neglected Tar, c. 1800, evokes the effects of impressment on a seaman's family and home.

Merchant seamen ashore from their ships (and usually conspicuous by their clothing, rolling stride, tattoos and generally weathered appearance) were another matter. Anyone with seafaring experience encountered in the street would first be asked to volunteer for naval service. If the potential recruit refused he was often plied with alcohol or simply seized and taken. A commonly held belief is that a trick was used in taverns, surreptitiously dropping a King's shilling ("prest money") into a man's drink, as by "finding" the shilling in his possession he was deemed to have volunteered. This practice led some tavern owners to put glass bottoms in their tankards. However, this is a legend; press officers were subject to fines for using trickery and a volunteer had a "cooling-off" period in which to change his mind.

The great majority of men pressed were taken from merchant ships at sea, especially those homeward bound for Britain. This was legal as long as the Navy replaced the man they took, and many naval captains would take the best seamen, replacing them with malcontents and landsmen from their own ship. It was also common for "trusted" volunteers to act as substitutes; they would then desert as soon as the merchant ship docked, and return to their Navy ship.

Outbound merchant ships, officers and apprentices were exempt from impressment. When war broke out, the Navy would deploy frigates and vessels off the coast to intercept inbound merchantmen. Reportedly some merchant captains redirected their ships to Irish ports to offload favoured crewmen, before making final landfall in England. In 1740, a merchantman fired on a cruiser that was attempting to impress its crew; threats of similar violence to avoid sailors being pressed were supposedly not uncommon, especially with the East India ships whose crews had been away from their families and England for a considerable time. In times of an extreme shortage of men, the Navy would "embargo" the coast for a short time; merchantmen had to supply a portion of their crew in exchange for permission to sail. Many merchant ships had hiding places constructed where their best crew could hide when approached by a naval vessel.

The owners of British whalers, because of the press, often appointed a master to them whilst the vessels were in port in order to protect the whalers' crews. Otherwise the press could take the men for naval service. The owners would then appoint an actual master to replace the placeholder masters.

In addition to impressment, Britain also used the Quota System (or The Quod) from 1795 to 1815, whereby each county was required to supply a certain number of volunteers, based on its population and the number of its seaports. Unlike impressment, the Quota System often resulted in criminals serving on board ships as counties who failed to meet their quota offered prisoners the option of completing their sentence or volunteering. Apart from the probably lower quality of recruits taken by this means, another downside of the Quota System was the frequent introduction of disease, especially typhus, to healthy ships.

== British North America ==
The Royal Navy also used impressment extensively in British North America during the 18th and 19th centuries. Navy press gangs sparked resistance, riots, and political turmoil in seaports such as Halifax, St John's, and Quebec City. One of the largest impressment operations occurred in the spring of 1757 in New York City, when 3,000 Royal Navy sailors under the command of Sir Charles Hardy entered the city and scoured the taverns and other sailors' gathering places. "All kinds of tradesmen and Negroes" were hauled in, nearly eight hundred in all. Four hundred were retained in the service

The Royal Navy extended the reach of its press gangs into coastal areas of British North America by the early 19th century. In response, sailors and residents fought back with a range of tactics. They sometimes reacted violently. The riots in St John's in 1794 and Halifax in 1805 led to a prohibition on impressment on shore for much of the Napoleonic Wars. The protest came from a wide swath of the urban community, including elites, rather than just sailors, and had a lasting negative impact on civil–military relations in what became Canada. The local communities did not encourage their young men to volunteer for Royal Navy service.

In Bermuda, which US independence was to elevate to an Imperial fortress, and which would replace Halifax as the home base of the North America Station, the navy spared Bermudian seamen from impressment, before and after US independence, due to the tiny colony's complete reliance on its seamen (most of whom turned their hands to privateering in wartime). HMS Whiting, notorious in the Maritimes for impressing locals, was built in Bermuda and had a Bermudian officer.

== France ==
Beginning in 1681, France used a form of conscription to man her navy. Known as Inscription Maritime, it obliged all seamen to be registered with the state so they could be called up when required. Both the registration and turning up when requested were compulsory and the system relied on violence just as much as impressment did in Britain. The public however, were not as disgusted by the idea of forced recruitment as their British counterparts; France had always operated conscription in its armies and therefore a similar arrangement for the navy was of no consequence. The scheme was not a success; France had approximately 60,000 seamen registered in 1792 while the British had twice that number in service.

France also operated a corps of regulars comprising long serving seamen trained in gunnery. The Corps d'Artillerie de la Marine would also guard dockyards and naval bases when the country was at peace. It was disbanded in 1793 by the revolutionary government, who considered it elitist.

The French method of manning the navy was ineffective, partly due to the lack of growth in the French marine population. The French navy was prevented from fully mobilising because of this throughout the Seven Years' War and the problem was exacerbated by sailors being taken prisoner or being killed in action. In 1756 alone, the British took approximately 7,000 French seamen captive. In 1808, the Inscription Maritime was extended to include caulkers and carpenters.

== Ireland ==
Ireland formed a separate but subordinate state, the Kingdom of Ireland, between 1534 and 1800. All of Ireland was united to Great Britain to form the United Kingdom of Great Britain and Ireland between 1801 and 1922. The Royal Navy recruited heavily in Ireland during these periods, including using impressment. For example, in 1734, impressment took place in Wicklow. Impressment was also common during the Napoleonic wars, although poverty in Ireland made sure that volunteers were usually available.

== Spain ==
Like France, Spain kept a register of her seamen. In 1787, the Matricula del Mar contained the names of 53,147 sailors, 36,203 fewer than were required to man the fleet and of those registered, only 5,800 had any experience of deep sea sailing; the remainder were only familiar with coastal waters. When insufficient seamen could be found, La Leva (the lever) as it was known, would take landsmen. In 1802, the entire system had come close to collapse and the government was forced to surrender control to the military, who immediately took steps to prevent anyone with a seafaring occupation escaping the list.

== United States ==
The American Continental Navy impressed men into its service during the American Revolutionary War. The Continental Congress authorized construction of thirteen frigates, including USS Virginia in 1775. The senior captain of the Continental Navy, James Nicholson, was appointed to command Virginia. When it was fitted out in 1777, Nicholson received orders to sail to Martinique. Many of Nicholson's crew had deserted to sign on as privateers, for higher pay at less risk. Therefore, Nicholson impressed about thirty citizens of Baltimore, an act expressly forbidden by Maryland law. Maryland governor Thomas Johnson demanded immediate release of the impressed men and Congress convinced Nicholson to release them all. Nicholson avoided impressment on land and instead stopped two American merchant ships at sea in 1780, to impress men from their crews.

The individual states did not deny the concept of impressment for their own navies, but were reluctant to grant the right to the Continental Congress. The concept of drafting men into armed service remained contentious, even after adoption of the federal constitution.

There are several documented cases of British seamen being impressed by the US Navy.

== Anglo American War of 1812 ==
In 1795, the Jay Treaty went into effect, addressing many issues left unresolved after the American Revolution, and averting a renewed conflict. However, the treaty's neglect to address British impressment of sailors from American ships and ports became a major cause of complaint among those who disapproved of it. While non-British subjects were not impressed, at this point Britain did not recognize naturalised American citizenship and treated anyone born a British subject as still "British"; as a result, the Royal Navy impressed an estimated 6,500 sailors who claimed to be American citizens.

During the wars with France (1793 to 1815), the Royal Navy aggressively reclaimed British deserters on board ships of other nations, both by halting and searching merchant ships, and in many cases, by searching American port cities. Although these impressments violated American law, Jefferson ignored them so as to remain on good terms with Britain as he was negotiating to obtain Florida from Spain. This changed in 1805 when the Royal Navy began seizing American merchantmen trading with French and Spanish islands in the West Indies, condemning the ships and their cargoes as prizes and impressing their crews. Under the Rule of 1756, in times of war direct trade between a neutral state and an enemy colony was forbidden if such trade had not existed in time of peace.

The impressment and ship seizures caused serious diplomatic tension, turned American public opinion against Britain, and were a cause of the War of 1812. Impressment was widely perceived as humiliating and dishonouring the U.S. because it was unable to protect its ships and sailors.

== End of impressment ==
Britain fought the war against Napoleon on the high seas, enlarging its Royal Navy from 135 ships in 1793 to 584 in 1812, and expanding personnel from 36,000 seamen in 1793 to 114,000 in 1812. In the spring of 1814, Napoleon surrendered, the allies restored the Bourbon kings to the throne, and France was no longer an enemy of Great Britain. The naval war was over and Britain could now sharply reduce its Royal Navy. It had no need to impress sailors, and never again used that means of forced recruitment, although it did not officially renounce the practice. By the time of the Crimean War, a new system of fixed-term engagements had given the Royal Navy a sufficient number of volunteer recruits to meet its manpower needs. Throughout the remainder of the 19th century changes in manpower needs and improved conditions of service permitted the Royal Navy to rely on voluntary enlistment to meet its requirements, augmented by the recall of reservists when necessary. This continued to be the case until World War I, when organised conscription was introduced in 1916 for all the military services.

== English and later British naval impressment laws ==
The first act of Parliament legalising this practice was passed in the reign of Queen Elizabeth in 1563, the Maintenance of the Navy Act 1562 (5 Eliz. 1. c. 4), and had the long title "An Act touching political considerations for the maintenance of the navy". It was renewed many times until 1631. In the Vagabonds Act 1597 (39 Eliz. 1. c. 4), several lists of persons were subject to impressment for service in the fleet. Following the execution of King Charles I, the Rump Parliament passed several acts in 1649 and 1650 concerning the encouragement of officers, mariners and for the impressment of seamen (e.g. 22 February 1648/9). The Greenwich Hospital, etc. Act 1695 (7 & 8 Will. 3. c. 21) was passed to build a permanent register of 30,000 men for ready call-up by the navy, "without having recourse to the barbarous and unconstitutional practice of pressing". The act also established basic rules and benefits for all types of seamen, including access to Greenwich Hospital.

With wars raging in Europe and in America the Navigation Act 1703 (2 & 3 Ann. c. 6) was passed "for the Encrease of Seamen and better Encouragement of Navigation, and the Protection of the Coal Trade". This act gave parish authorities the power to indenture and apprentice boys to the sea, from as young as 10, until age 21; it also reaffirmed that rogues and vagabonds were subject to be pressed into the navy. The act establishes administration and regulations for the act, including youth who volunteer for the indenture and certain seamen engaged in the coal trade supplying cities, are exempt from impressment for three years. This act was followed by the Recruiting Act 1703 (2 & 3 Ann. c. 13), which allows impressing able-bodied men into the army and navy who did not have visible means of subsistence; also as a wartime measure the act relaxes English crewing requirements under the Navigation Acts, to make experienced English seamen more available to serve on ships of war. In 1740, impressment was limited to men between 18 and 45, and it also exempted foreigners.

As part of a wider effort to build colonial capability and harass its enemies, Parliament passed the Trade to America Act 1707 (6 Ann. c. 64). Section 9 mandated that mariners serving on board privateers and trading ships in any part of America, and those on shore, are not liable for impressment. Lingering questions remained whether the law applied only to the navy, or to civil authorities as well, and whether it applied only to the current war or to all future wars. Two attorneys-general of Great Britain, one in 1716, and another in 1740, issued opinions that the 1707 act was no longer in effect, but many American colonists disagreed.

Despite doubts over the continuing legality of impressment in continental waters, but for similar reasons, Parliament passed the Sugar Trade Act 1746 (19 Geo. 2. c. 30) stating that impressment was forbidden in the West Indies, but it added certain exceptions and made no specific mention of America. This would lead to the Knowles Riot in Boston the following year, and continuing colonial questions, particularly in heavily maritime New England.

The last law was passed in 1835, in which the power to impress was reaffirmed. This limited the length of service of a pressed man to five years, and added the provision that a man could not be pressed twice. Although Britain abandoned the practice of impressment in 1815, impressment remained legal until the early 1900s, and the various laws authorising impressment have never been repealed.

== British army impressment laws ==
Starting in 1645, the New Model Army raised by Oliver Cromwell to overthrow Charles I during the English Civil War was largely manned by impressment. After the restoration of the monarchy, impressment into the army was discontinued.

During the American Revolutionary War, after the losses at the Battle of Saratoga and the impending hostilities with France, the existing voluntary enlistment measures were judged to be insufficient. Between 1775 and 1781, the regular army increased from 48,000 to 110,000. Two acts were passed, the Recruiting Act 1778 and the Recruiting Act 1779, for the impression of individuals into the British Army. The chief advantages of these acts was in the number of volunteers brought in under the apprehension of impressment. To avoid impressment, some recruits incapacitated themselves by cutting off the thumb and forefinger of the right hand, making it impossible to use a musket or sword.The Recruiting Act of 1779 was repealed on 26 May 1780, and army impressment was permanently discontinued.

During the experiment, the British government allowed army impressment under severely restricted circumstances — both acts emphasized volunteering over impressment, and offered strong incentives to volunteers as a "carrot and stick" tactic, to encourage the men to volunteer lest they be pressed instead. The impressment portion of the 1778 Act applied only to Scotland and the area around London, excluding Wales and the rest of England, to avoid interfering with harvesting. The 1779 Act applied to all of Great Britain, but was initially suspended everywhere except the area around London, and actually applied to all of Great Britain for only six months, until the 1779 act was repealed in May 1780, and army impressment ceased in Britain.

Unlike naval impressment, army impressment applied only to "able-bodied idle, and disorderly Persons, who could not, upon Examination, prove themselves to exercise and industriously follow some lawful Trade or Employment, or to have some Substance sufficient for their Support and Maintenance", as well as smugglers, according to the 1778 law, but excluding from that any men who were voters, or harvest workers. The 1779 law extended impressment also to "incorrigible rogues" who had abandoned their families, and left them as expenses on the parish. Impressed apprentices were released under appeal from their masters, and impressed foreigners were released when requested by their countries' embassies.

== In popular culture ==
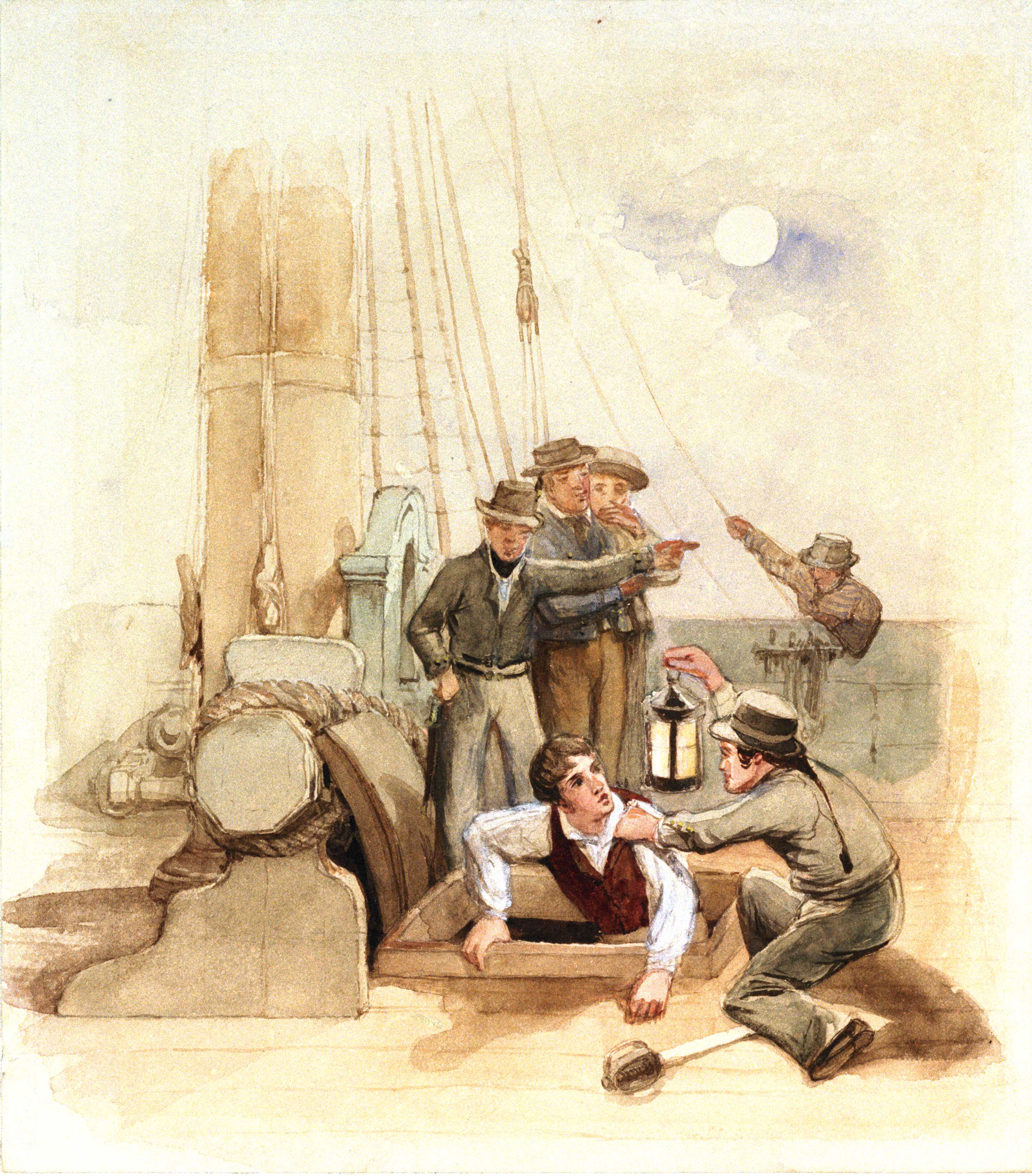
Illustration from Poor Jack (1840) of a boy being pressed

Literature

- Poor Jack (1840) by Frederick Marryat, features a scene in which a press-gang board a merchantman and collar a young sailor below decks. When brought on deck, he finds that he has been impressed by his own brother.
- The events in Elizabeth Gaskell's novel Sylvia's Lovers (1863) take place against the background of the practice of impressment during the early phases of the Napoleonic Wars. Charlie Kinraid is forcibly enlisted in the Royal Navy by a press gang and later Sylvia Robson's father is executed for leading a revengeful raid on press-gang collaborators.
- In Herman Melville's novel Billy Budd, Sailor, first published in 1924, and in the opera and film based on it, Billy is impressed to service on a British warship from the Rights-of-Man, a merchant ship.
- In A Ship of the Line by C. S. Forester, Captain Horatio Hornblower is depicted, when urgently needing sailors to make up his crew, as stopping a ship of the British East India Company and impressing a large part of its sailors – the sailors being very reluctant, since conditions in the Royal navy ships were far worse than in those of the civilian Company.
- In China Miéville's 2002 novel The Scar, many members of The Armada society are pressganged from various ships to live on the floating colony. Miéville favours the word "pressganged" and has used it in numerous works of fiction to refer to people compelled to join some organisation or faction against their wills for political purposes.

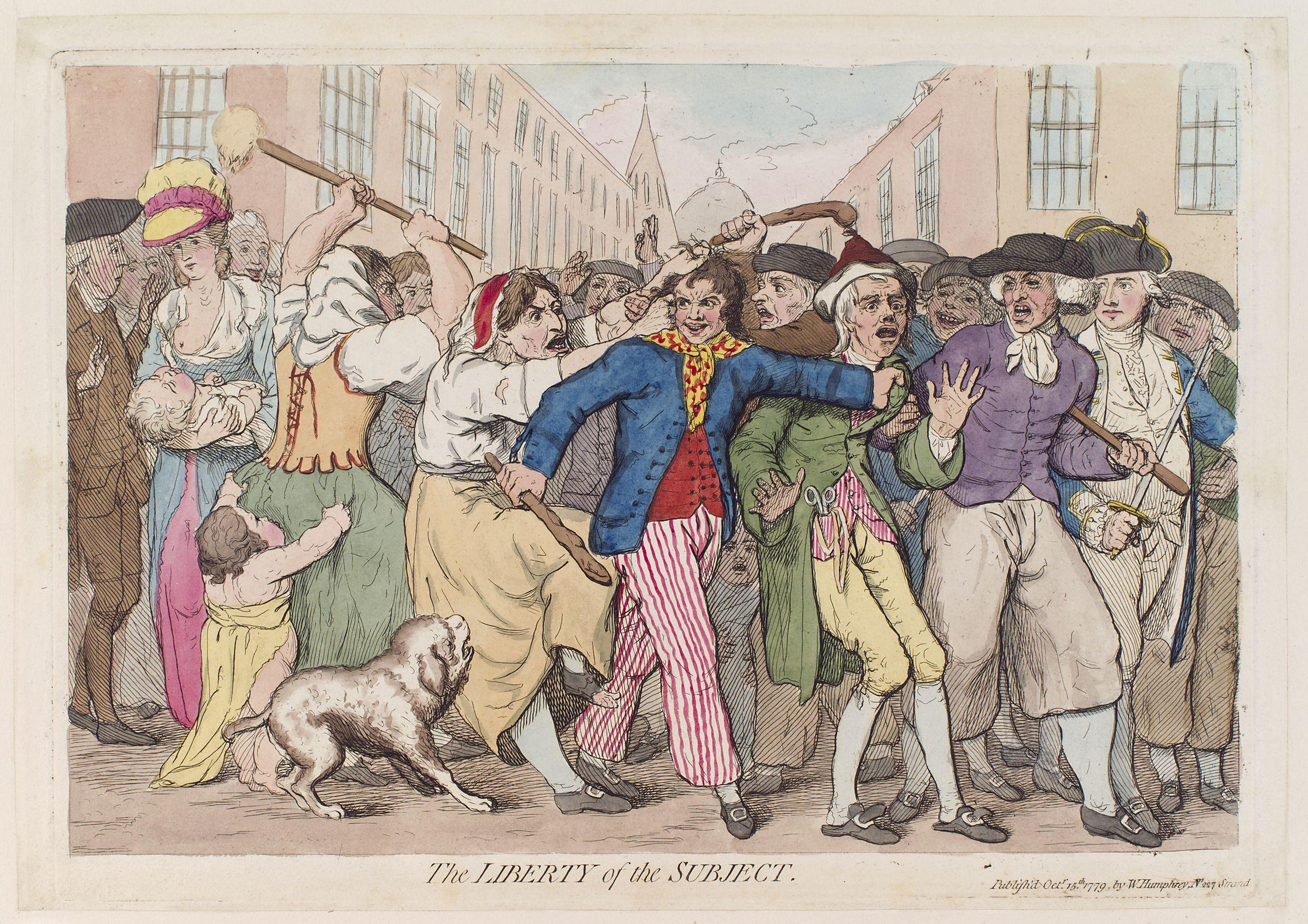
James Gillray (1756–1815) "The Liberty of the Subject" 15 Oct 1779

Poetry

- Elizabeth Barrett Browning's first published poem, "On the Cruelty of Forcement to Man" (c. 1812, when she was six years old), addressed impressment.
- John Ashton's 1888 compilation Modern Street Ballads includes "Victory", relating the plight of a young aristocratic lady whose parents, disapproving of her poor suitor, arrange to have him pressed to service aboard Lord Nelson's flagship of that name, aboard which he is killed at the Battle of Trafalgar.

Caricature

- James Gillray (1756–1815); Caricaturist, portrays impressment by the visual satire in his engraving "The Liberty of the Subject" (October 15, 1779).

Music

- The narrator of the folk song Lowlands of Holland is a woman whose husband has been impressed.
- Garage punk band The Murder City Devils' song "Press Gang", from their album In Name and Blood, is about a man who becomes "a victim of the press gang", a group of soldiers which brings him from a ship at sea to a town and publicly hangs him for unnamed offenses.
- Folk singer Richard Digance wrote "I Hear The Pressgang", describing the tale of a man forcibly enlisted into the Royal Navy who later drowned at sea. The song asks who will look after his wife, child and farm whilst he is gone.
- The title track of The Unthanks album Here's the Tender Coming describes the pressing of men into service.

Cinema

- Mutiny on the Bounty (1935): One night in Portsmouth, England in 1787, a press gang breaks into a local tavern and presses all of the men drinking there into naval service.
- H.M.S. Defiant (Lewis Gilbert, 1962): the opening scene depicts a press gang in Spithead, England, during the Napoleonic Wars forcibly recruiting men at night in pubs or in the street. Later, we see them on the deck being "compulsorily enlisted".

== See also ==
- Blood tax (Brazil)
- Busification
- Draft evasion
- Impressment in Nova Scotia
- Military recruitment
- Roundup (history)
- Shanghaiing

== Bibliography ==
- Adkins, Roy; Adkins, Lesley (2006). The War For All The World's Oceans. Lancaster Place, London: Little, Brown Book Group. ISBN 0-316-72837-3.
- Anderson, Adam (1787). An historical and chronological deduction of the origin of commerce... Blackfriars, London: Logographic Press.
- Bickham, Troy (2012). The Weight of Vengeance. New York: Oxford University Press. ISBN 978-0-1953-9178-7.
- Brunsman, Denver (2013). The Evil Necessity:British Naval Impressment in the Eighteenth-Century Atlantic World. Univ. of Virginia Press. ISBN 978-0-8139-3351-1.
- Cray, Robert E. (2005). "Remembering the USS Chesapeake: The Politics of Maritime. Death and Impressment". Journal of the Early Republic. 25 (3). University of Pennsylvania Press: 445–474. doi:10.1353/jer.2005.0050. JSTOR 30043338.
- Cometti, Elizabeth; et al. (The Walter Clinton Jackson Essays in the Social Sciences) (1942). Impressment during the American Revolution. University of North Carolina Press. ISBN 0-8078-0389-8.
- Curtis, Edward (1972). The Organization of the British Army in the American Revolution. E.P. Publishing. ISBN 0-85409-906-9.
- Dancy, J. Ross (2015). The Myth of the Press Gang: Volunteers, Impressment and the Naval Manpower. Boydell Press. ISBN 978-1-7832-7003-3.
- Deeben, John P. (2012). "The War of 1812 Stoking the Fires: The Impressment of Seaman Charles Davis by the U.S. Navy". Prologue Magazine. Vol. 44, no. 2.
- Ennis, Daniel James (2002). Enter the Press-Gang: Naval Impressment in Eighteenth-Century British Literature. University of Delaware Press. ISBN 0-8741-3755-1.
- Fischer, Lewis R.; Nordvik, Helge W (1990). Shipping and Trade, 1750–1950: Essays in International Maritime Economic History. Lofthouse. ISBN 1-8551-7001-9.
- Frykman, Niklas (April 2009). "Seamen on Late Eighteenth-Century European Warships". International Review of Social History. 54 (1): 67–93. doi:10.1017/S0020859009000030. S2CID 145395508.
- Fowler, William M., Jr. (1974). "The Non-Volunteer Navy". United States Naval Institute Proceedings. 100 (8).
- Gilje, Paul A. (2010). "Free Trade and Sailors' Rights: The Rhetoric of the War of 1812". Journal of the Early Republic. 30 (1). doi:10.1353/jer.0.0130. JSTOR 40662251.
- Haywood, I (2010). "The Transformation of Caricature: A Reading of Gillray's The Liberty of the Subject". Eighteenth-Century Studies. 43 (2): 223–242. doi:10.1353/ecs.0.0108. ISSN 0013-2586. OCLC 529159264. S2CID 144447875.
- Hill, J. R. (2002). The Oxford Illustrated History of the Royal Navy. Oxford University Press. ISBN 0-19-860527-7.
- Hume, David (1758). "Of Some Remarkable Customs". Essays and Treatises on Several Subjects. Strand and Edinburgh: A. Millar and A. Kincaid & A. Donaldson – via Internet Archive.
- Keegan, John (1988). Battle at Sea. Pimlico. ISBN 0-7126-5991-9.
- Lavery, Brian (1992). Nelson's Navy - The Ships, Men and Organisation 1793 - 1815. London: Conway Maritime Press. ISBN 0-8517-7 521-7.
- Lavery, Brian (2010). Royal Tars: The Lower Deck of the Royal Navy 875-1850. Annapolis, Maryland: Naval Institute Press. ISBN 978-1-5911-4743-5.
- Lewis, Michael (2006). A Social History of the Navy 1793-1815. Greenhill. ISBN 1-8617-6232-1.
- Marcus, G. J. (1975). Heart of Oak: A Survey of British Sea Power in the Georgian Era. London: Oxford University Press. ISBN 0192158120.
- Mercer, Keith (2008). North Atlantic Press Gangs: Impressment and Naval-civilian Relations in Nova Scotia and Newfoundland, 1749--1815.
- Mercer, Keith (2010). "Northern Exposure: Resistance to Naval Impressment in British North America, 1775–1815". Canadian Historical Review. 91 (2): 199–232. doi:10.3138/chr.91.2.199. ISSN 1710-1093.
- Miller, Nathan (1974). Sea of Glory. New York: David McKay. ISBN 0-679-50392-7.
- Nash, Gary (1986). The Urban Crucible, The Northern Seaports and the Origins of the American Revolution. Harvard University Press. ISBN 0-674-93058-4.
- Pappalardo, Bruno (2019). How to Survive in the Georgian Navy: A Sailor's Guide. London: Osprey Publishing. ISBN 978-1-47-283086-9.
- Pope, Dudley (1996). Life in Nelson's Navy. Annapolis: Naval Institute Press. ISBN 1-55750-516-0.
- Price, Catherine (2017). "The Age of Scurvy". Distillations. 3 (2).
- Ray, Costello (2012). Black Salt: Seafarers of African Descent on British Ships. Liverpool University Press. ISBN 978-1-84631-818-4.
- Rodger, Nicholas (1986). The Wooden World: An Anatomy of the Georgian Navy. W. W. Norton and Company. ISBN 978-0-39-331469-4.
- Rodger, Nicholas (2004). The Command of the Ocean: A Naval History of Britain, 1649–1815. W. W. Norton and Company. ISBN 978-0-1410-2690-9.
- Rogers, Nicholas (2018). "British impressment and its discontents". International Journal of Maritime History. 30 (1): 52–73. doi:10.1177/0843871417745731.
- Rogers, Nicholas (2007). The Press Gang: Naval Impressment and its Opponents in Georgian Britain. A&C Black. ISBN 978-1-8528-5568-0.
- Sawtell, Clement Cleveland (1940). "Impressment of American Seamen by the British". Essex Institute Historical Collections. 76 (4). Salem: Newcomb & Gauss.
- Selement, George (1973). "Impressment and the American Merchant Marine 1782–1812: an American View". The Mariner's Mirror. 59 (4). doi:10.1080/00253359.1973.10657927.
- Smith, Page (1976). A new age now begins. McGraw-Hill. ISBN 0-07-059097-4.
- Steel, Anthony (1952). "Impressment in the Monroe-Pinkney Negotiation, 1806-1807". The American Historical Review. 57 (2). American Historical Association: 352–369. doi:10.2307/1849880. ISSN 1937-5239. JSTOR 1849880.
- Steel, Anthony (1949). "Anthony Merry and the Anglo-American Dispute about Impressment, 1803-6". Cambridge Historical Journal. 9 (3): 331–351. doi:10.1017/S147469130000319X. JSTOR 3020762.
- Tucker, Spencer; Reuter, Frank Theodore (1996). Injured Honor: the Chesapeake-Leopard Affair, June 22, 1807. Naval Institute Press. ISBN 1-55750-824-0. OCLC 70291925.
- Urquhart, Thomas (1816). Letters on the evils of impressment: with the outline of a plan for doing them away, on which depend the wealth, prosperity, and consequence of Great Britain. London: J.Richardson. ISBN 978-1-169-10310-8.
- Usher, Roland G. Jr. (1951). "Royal Navy Impressment During the American Revolution". The Mississippi Valley Historical Review. 37 (4). Organization of American Historians: 673–688. doi:10.2307/1889363. ISSN 0161-391X. JSTOR 1889363.
- Wilson, Ben (2014). Empire of the Deep The Rise and Fall of the British Navy. Orion Publishing Group, Limited. ISBN 978-0-7538-2920-2.
- Zimmerman, James Fulton (1925). Impressment of American Seamen. New York: University of Columbia.
