= Convoy JW 54A =

Arctic convoy from Great Britain

- Part of the Arctic Convoys of the Second World War
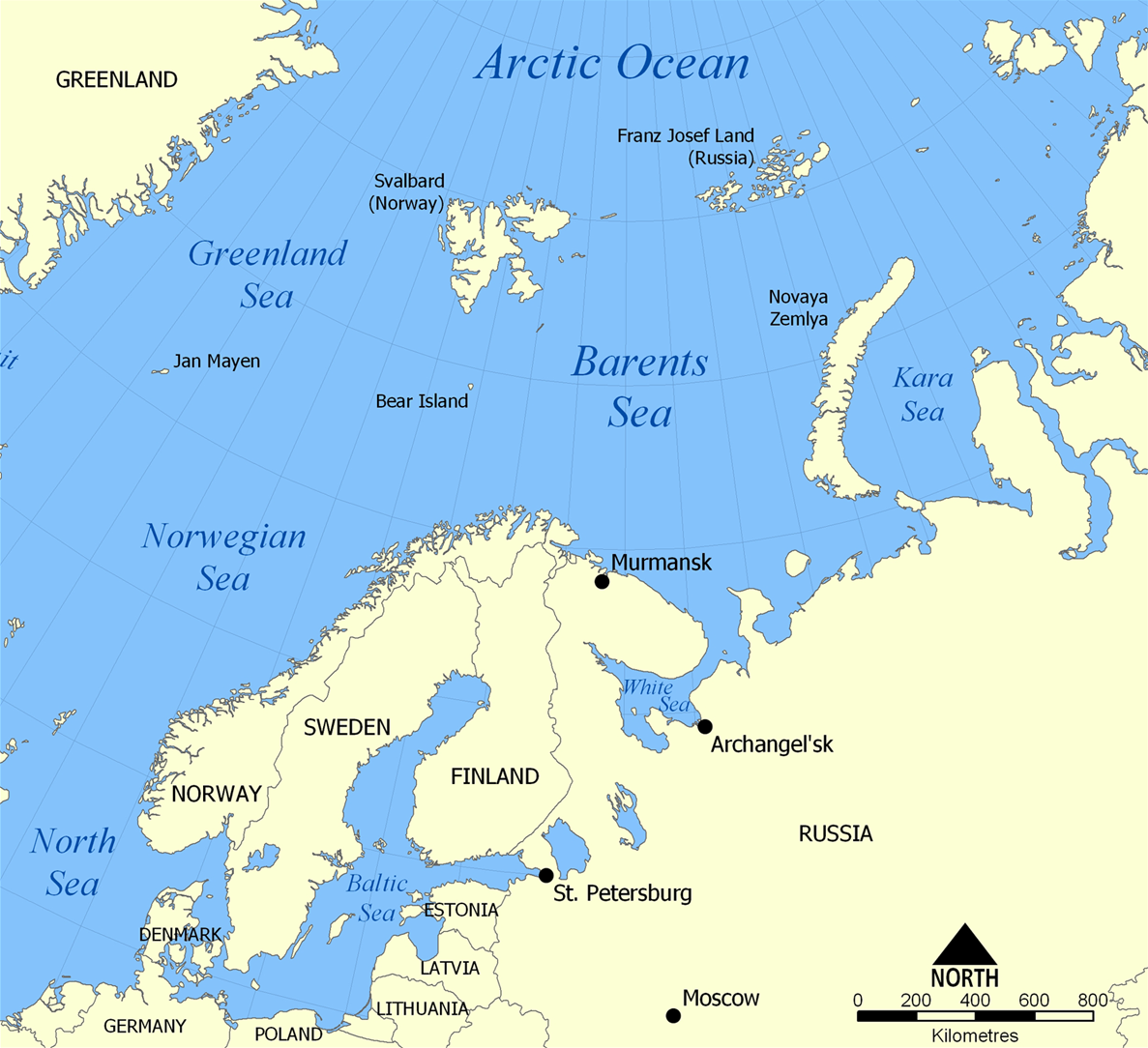
- The Norwegian and the Barents seas, site of the Arctic convoys
Date
Location
15–24 November 1943
- Norwegian Sea
- Barents Sea

Convoy JW 54A was an Arctic convoy sent from Britain by the Western Allies to aid the Soviet Union during the Second World War. It sailed in November 1943, reaching the Soviet northern ports at the end of the month. JW 54A was the first out-bound Arctic convoy of the 1943–1944 winter season, following their suspension during the summer. All ships arrived safely.

== Forces ==
Convoy JW 54A consisted of 19 merchant ships which departed from Loch Ewe on 15 November 1943. Close escort was provided by the destroyers Inconstant and Whitehall, and two other vessels. These were supported by seven Home Fleet destroyers led by HMS Onslow (Captain James McCoy Senior Officer escort) The convoy accompanied by a local escort group from Britain, and was also joined later by a local escort from Murmansk. A cruiser cover force comprising HMS Kent (Rear-Admiral Arthur Palliser), HMS Jamaica and HMS Bermuda also followed the convoy, to guard against attack by surface units. Heavy cover was provided by the Home Fleet comprising the battleship HMS Anson, the US cruiser USS Tuscaloosa and four US destroyers. Convoy JW 54A was opposed by a U-boat force of five boats in a patrol line, gruppe Eisenbart (Ironbeard), in the Norwegian Sea. A surface force comprising the battleship Scharnhorst and five destroyers was also available, stationed at Altenfjord.

== Voyage ==
Convoy JW 54A departed Loch Ewe on 15 November 1943, accompanied by its local escort, of three destroyers, and its close escort. Three days later, on 18 November, it was joined by the ocean escort, while the local escort departed. At the same time the Cruiser Force and the distant cover from Scapa Flow also put to sea, taking station in the Norwegian Sea. The convoy was not sighted by German reconnaissance aircraft, nor by any of the Eisenbart U-boats, and crossed the Norwegian and Barents Seas without incident. On 24 November the convoy arrived safely at the Kola Inlet.

== Aftermath ==
Convoy JW 54A was a successful start to the 1943–1944 convoy season, with the safe arrival of 19 merchant ships.

== Allied order of battle ==
=== Merchant ships ===
Ships convoyed (Note: Convoys had a standard formation of short columns, number 1 to port in the direction of travel. Each position in the column was numbered; position number 11 was the first ship in column 1, 12 was the second ship in the column; position number 21 was the first ship in column 2.)
Name	Year	Flag	GRT	No.	Notes
SS Copeland	1923	Merchant Navy	1,526	33	
SS Daniel Drake	1943	United States	7,176	12	
SS Edmund Fanning	1943	United States	7,176	21	
SS Empire Carpenter	1943	Merchant Navy	7,030	62	
SS Empire Celia	1943	Merchant Navy	7,030	61	
SS Empire Nigel	1943	Merchant Navy	7,067	71	
SS Fort Yukon	1943	Merchant Navy	7,153	41	
SS Gilbert Stuart	1943	United States	7,176	23	
SS Henry Villard	1942	United States	7,176	72	
SS James Gordon Bennet	1942	United States	7,176	32	
SS James Smith	1942	United States	7,181	51	
SS Junecrest	1942	Merchant Navy	6,945	11	
SS Mijdrecht	1931	Holland	7,493	52	
MV Norlys	1936	Panama	9,892	42	Fuelling tanker
SS Ocean Vanity	1942	Merchant Navy	7,174	22	
SS Ocean Verity	1942	Merchant Navy	7,174	53	
SS Park Holland	1943	United States	7,176	63	
SS Thomas Sim Lee	1942	United States	7,191	31	
SS William Windom	1943	United States	7,191	13	
Lend-lease vessels in transit
USS T116	—	United States Navy	—	—	Admirable-class minesweeper
USS T117	—	United States Navy	—	—	Admirable-class minesweeper
USS BO 206	—	United States	—	—	Motor Launch
USS BO 207	—	United States	—	—	Motor Launch
USS BO 212	—	United States	—	—	Motor Launch

=== Convoy escorts ===
Convoy escorts (in relays)
Name	Flag	Type	Notes
Western local escort
HMS Termagant	Royal Navy	T-class destroyer	15–18 November
ORP Burza	Polish Navy	Wicher-class destroyer	15–18 November
HMS Brissenden	Royal Navy	Hunt-class destroyer	15–18 November
Close escort
HMS Inconstant	Royal Navy	I-class destroyer	15–24 November
HMS Whitehall	Royal Navy	W-class destroyer	15–24 November
HMS Heather	Royal Navy	Flower-class corvette	15–24 November
HMS Hussar	Royal Navy	Halcyon-class minesweeper	15–24 November
Ocean escort
HMCS Haida	Royal Navy	Tribal-class destroyer	18–25 November
HMCS Huron	Royal Navy	Tribal-class destroyer	18–25 November
HMCS Iroquois	Royal Navy	Tribal-class destroyer	18–25 November
HMS Impulsive	Royal Navy	I-class destroyer	18–25 November
HMS Onslow	Royal Navy	O-class destroyer	18–25 November
HMS Onslaught	Royal Navy	O-class destroyer	18–25 November
HMS Obedient	Royal Navy	O-class destroyer	Returned, defects
HMS Orwell	Royal Navy	O-class destroyer	18–25 November
Cruiser cover
HMS Kent	Royal Navy	County-class cruiser	19–24 November
HMS Jamaica	Royal Navy	Fiji-class cruiser	19–24 November
HMS Bermuda	Royal Navy	Fiji-class cruiser	19–24 November
Distant cover
HMS Anson	Royal Navy	King George V-class battleship	19–24 November
USS Tuscaloosa	United States Navy	New Orleans-class cruiser	19–24 November
USS Corry	United States Navy	Gleaves-class destroyer	19–24 November
USS Fitch	United States Navy	Gleaves-class destroyer	19–24 November
USS Forrest	United States Navy	Gleaves-class destroyer	19–24 November
USS Hobson	United States Navy	Gleaves-class destroyer	19–24 November

== German order of battle ==
=== Kriegsmarine ===
U-boats and ships
Name	Flag	Class	Notes
U-boats
U-277	Kriegsmarine	Type VIIC submarine	
U-307	Kriegsmarine	Type VIIC submarine	
U-354	Kriegsmarine	Type VIIC submarine	
U-360	Kriegsmarine	Type VIIC submarine	
U-387	Kriegsmarine	Type VIIC submarine	
Ships
Scharnhorst	Kriegsmarine	Scharnhorst-class battleship	
Z29	Kriegsmarine	Type 1936A-class destroyer	
Z30	Kriegsmarine	Type 1936A-class destroyer	
Z33	Kriegsmarine	Type 1934A-class destroyer	
Z34	Kriegsmarine	1936A (Mob)-class destroyer	
Z38	Kriegsmarine	1936A (Mob)-class destroyer	

== Bibliography ==
- Jordan, Roger W. (2006) [1999]. The World's Merchant Fleets 1939: The Particulars and Wartime Fates of 6,000 Ships (2nd ed.). London: Chatham/Lionel Leventhal. ISBN 978-1-86176-293-1.
- Kindell, Don (18 September 2026). "Arnold Hague Convoy Database: Convoy JW.54A". convoyweb org uk.
- Mitchell, W. H.; Sawyer, L. A. (1990) [1965]. The Empire Ships: A Record of British-built and acquired Merchant Ships during the Second World War (2nd ed.). London (New York, Hamburg, Hong Kong): Lloyd's of London Press. ISBN 1-85044-275-4.
- Rohwer, Jürgen; Hümmelchen, Gerhard (2005) [1972]. Chronology of the War at Sea, 1939–1945: The Naval History of World War Two (3rd rev. ed.). London: Chatham. ISBN 978-1-86176-257-3.
- Ruegg, R.; Hague, A. (1993) [1992]. Convoys to Russia: Allied Convoys and Naval Surface Operations in Arctic Waters 1941–1945 (2nd rev. enl. ed.). Kendal: World Ship Society. ISBN 0-905617-66-5.
