= Impressment in Nova Scotia =

Conscription of Nova Scotians into the Royal Navy

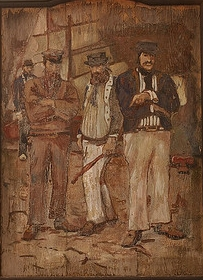
Press gang in Halifax, Nova Scotia

Impressment by the Royal Navy in Nova Scotia happened primarily during the American Revolutionary War and the French Revolutionary and Napoleonic Wars. Guard boats of the Navy patrolled Halifax harbour day and night and they boarded all incoming and outgoing vessels. The Navy consistently struggled with desertion in Nova Scotia, and senior naval commanders recognised that only impressment could ensure local squadrons had enough men onboard. The guard boats were used as floating press gangs, impressing every fiftieth man on merchant ships entering the harbour. Due to constant manpower shortages, they even pressed Americans from cartels and prison hulks.

Royal Navy warships frequently sent armed press gangs into Halifax and other Nova Scotian towns, where they occasionally fought with local townspeople. Such incidents were often violent and a number of people were killed. The behaviours of the press gangs were the subject of constant criticism from local colonial officials in Nova Scotia.

Stemming from impressment disturbances, civil-naval relations deteriorated in Nova Scotia from 1805 to the War of 1812, by which time the Royal Navy had publicly exempted Nova Scotians from impressment, and groups such as the Society of Merchants campaigned against perceived high-handedness of the Navy's actions in Nova Scotia. However, as their warships were short-handed, Navy captains began to violate impressment regulations in the final years of the Napoleonic Wars. Impressment had a negative impact on Nova Scotian privateers during the American Revolutionary War and the War of 1812.

== American War of Independence (1775-1783) ==
New England Planters and other Nova Scotians were exempted from naval service during the 1760s, but impressment became a serious issue during the American Revolution. The American conflict severed the Royal Navy from its traditional labour market in North America, which pressured loyalist colonies such as Nova Scotia and Newfoundland to make up for the shortage of manpower. By August 1775, the Nova Scotia government received a petition from Halifax merchants complaining about impressment. The issue came to a head in October when the Assembly petitioned Governor Francis Legge to put a stop to impressment in Nova Scotia.

By 1776 the Royal Navy used guard boats as floating press gangs, conscripting every fiftieth man from ships entering the harbour. It even pressed Americans from cartels and prison hulks. Still in need of men, warships sent armed press gangs into Halifax, where they fought with townspeople. In 1778, Lieutenant-Governor Richard Hughes lashed out at the Navy for press gang incidents that were frequently marked by quarrels, bloodshed and the loss of life. Hughes complained that press gangs caused social unrest in Halifax and he banned them from shore unless they had colonial permission. The press gangs would drive all before them in the streets. The Halifax grand jury criticized the Navy for its disregard of provincial and municipal authority, and also for binding recruits’ hands behind their backs and marching them through the street like criminals.

The Royal Navy pressed approximately 200 Liverpool residents in the 18th and 19th centuries. Liverpool experienced more of these incidents than other regional ports in British North America. At least two dozen of Liverpool's pressed sailors died during their service in the Navy or were never heard from again. For the New England Planters who settled in Liverpool in the 1760s, they were largely protected from press gangs based on age, social status, and colonial exemptions, but their sons and descendants had a much tougher time avoiding impressment.

Outside of Halifax, during the American Revolutionary War the Royal Navy concentrated its recruitment efforts on coastal shipping and small ports such as Liverpool. In one instance, HMS Senegal was in Liverpool for about four months and impressment loomed as a possibility the entire time. It pressed three men there and in the neighbouring villages of Port Medway, Port Mouton, and Brooklyn. Another ship, HMS Blonde, during the late 1770s, cruised extensively in the St. Lawrence River and coastal Nova Scotia, entering dozens of recruits at Halifax and from ships and towns along the South Shore.

Impressment damaged Nova Scotia trade, but the Navy's inability to stop American privateers was a much larger concern. American privateers captured hundreds of vessels and made bold amphibious assaults on Liverpool in 1780 and Lunenburg in 1782. Although Halifax led the way, Liverpool sent out five privateers during the war, including Lucy, a schooner of 18 guns and 50 men. There was intense competition for sailors from trading vessels and the Navy.

As a merchant, Simeon Perkins attempted to protect the citizens of Liverpool from the press gangs. He issued papers saying that sailors were master, mates and apprentices, or under the age of 18, all of whom were exempted from impressment. Fraudulent protections were common. In 1800, however, Liverpool privateers had a large portion of their crews pressed. 80 men were pressed over the year. The privateer Duke of Kent's crew met with HMS Nereide and many privateers were pressed into service: of the 20 pressed sailors, nine returned home at various times, eight died, and three were never heard from again.

== Napoleonic Wars ==
Governor Wentworth and his council issued at least 13 warrants between 1793 and 1805. Only sailors could be taken into service. The Royal Navy used guard boats to press at sea, over which Nova Scotia had no jurisdiction. Wentworth did succeed in exempting many groups of people from impressment: freeholders, militiamen, market boat crews and even the Dartmouth ferry operator. This exempted most Nova Scotians from impressment during the Napoleonic period, but it also prevented the Navy from keeping its ships manned and ready for duty.

The first press warrant granted in Nova Scotia was in April 1793, when Wentworth granted a warrant to Commander Rupert George of HMS Hussar. George sent press gangs from Hussar into Halifax. In one night they detained 50 to 60 men, including several Liverpool mariners, and brought them aboard Hussar. Liverpool sailors also stood on constant guard for press gangs and guard boats at Halifax and often refused to sail there based on rumours of impressment. Vice-Admiral George Berkely declared in 1806, unless he sent these small warships to maritime communities and regional shipping lanes to press sailors, there was no hope of manning the North American squadron.

=== Halifax Impressment Riot 1805 ===
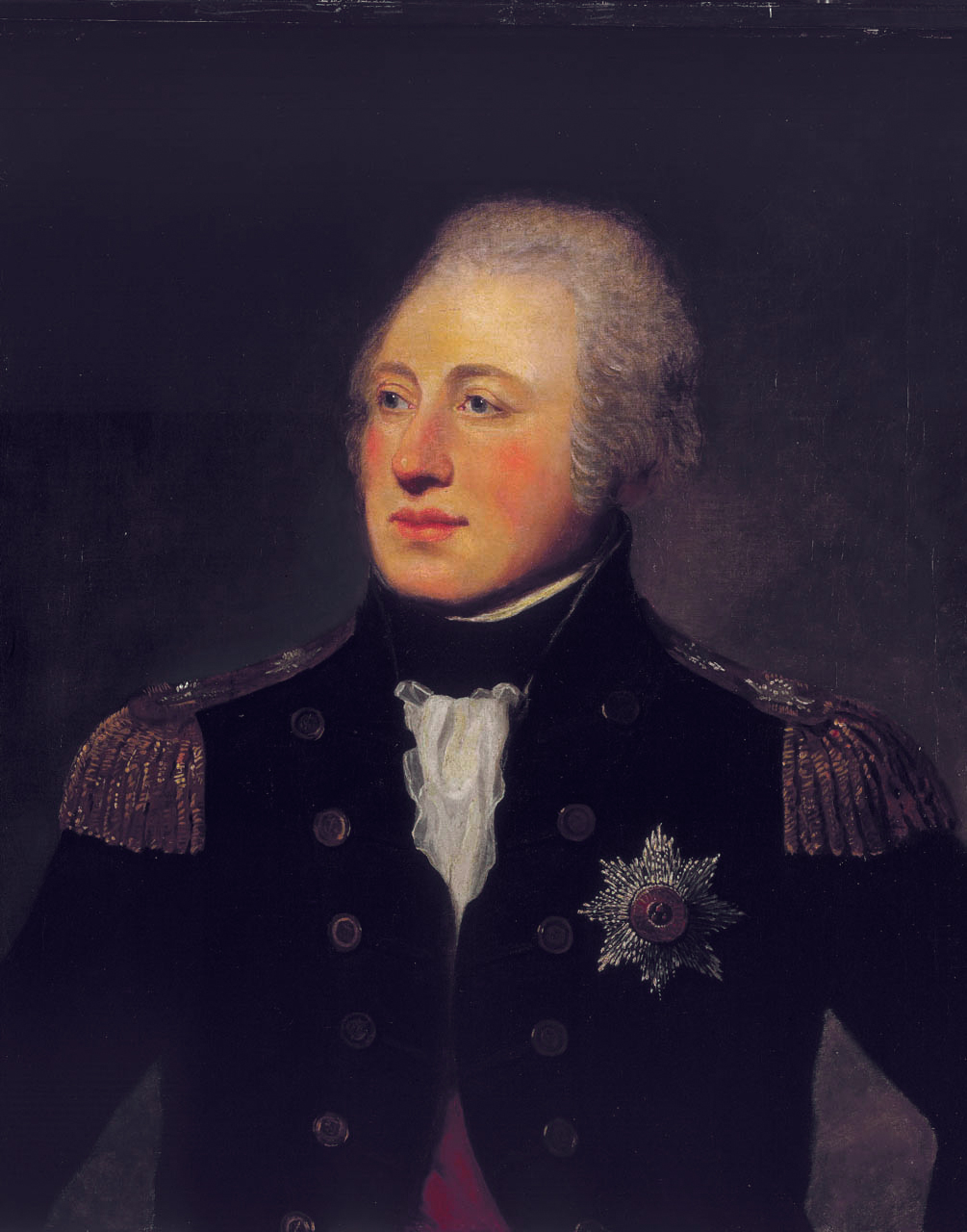
Vice Admiral Andrew Mitchell, who ordered the press gang of HMS Cleopatra ashore to Halifax

The Royal Navy's manpower problems in Nova Scotia peaked in 1805. British warships were short-handed from high desertion rates, and naval captains were handicapped in filling those vacancies by provincial impressment regulations. Desperate for sailors, the Navy impressed them all over the North Atlantic region in 1805, from Halifax and Charlottetown to Saint John and Quebec City. In early May, Vice-Admiral Andrew Mitchell sent press gangs from several warships into downtown Halifax. They conscripted men first and asked questions later, rounding up dozens of potential recruits.

The breaking point came in October 1805, when Vice-Admiral Mitchell sent press gangs from HMS Cleopatra to the streets of Halifax armed with bayonets, sparking a major riot in which one man was killed and several others were injured. Wentworth lashed out at the admiral for sparking urban unrest and breaking provincial impressment laws, and his administration exploited this violent episode to put even tighter restrictions of recruiting in Nova Scotia.

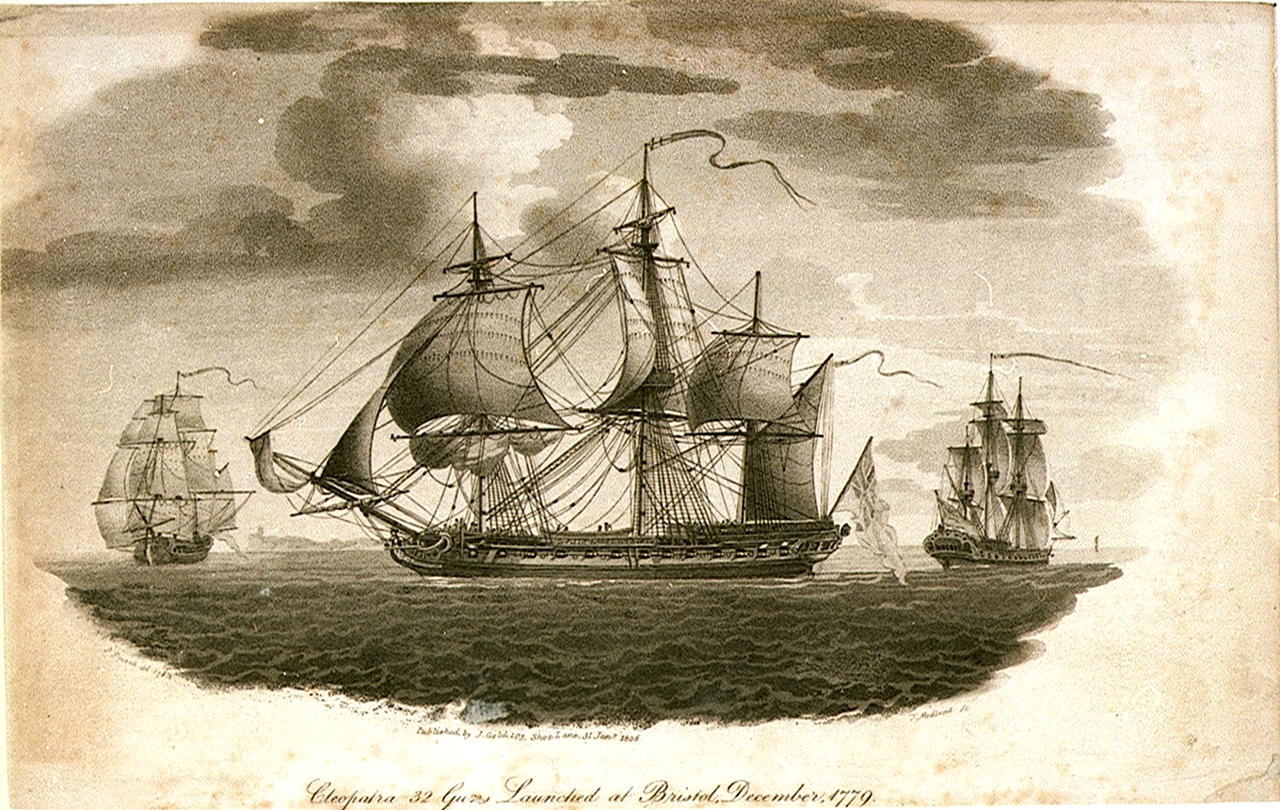
A press gang from HMS Cleopatra during the Halifax Riot (1805). Image by Nicholas Pocock

Stemming from impressment disturbances, civil-naval relations deteriorated in Nova Scotia from 1805 to the War of 1812. HMS Whiting was in Liverpool for only about a week, but the possibility of impressment loomed over the small town the entire time, and naval impressment remained a serious source of resentment among sailors along the South Shore. After leaving Liverpool, Whiting entered Shelburne and impressed several inhabitants, breaking into homes and leading to more than a dozen local families to move closer to the forest to avoid being impressed.

== War of 1812 ==
By the War of 1812, the Royal Navy had publicly exempted Nova Scotians from impressment, and groups such as the Society of Merchants campaigned against perceived high-handedness of the Navy's actions in Nova Scotia. Not surprisingly, as their warships were short-handed, naval captains began to violate impressment regulations in the final years of the Napoleonic Wars. Impressment had a negative impact on Nova Scotian privateers in the War of 1812: dozens of local men were impressed into the Navy, fear of impressment caused recruitment problems and desertions from the privateer vessels, the disputes with the Navy hindered the privateer’s ability to attack American shipping and protect themselves against American naval attacks.

== See also ==
- Conscription in Canada
