= Brisbane Ladies =

Australian folksong

"Brisbane Ladies" is an Australian folksong and is one of many adaptations of the traditional British naval song "Spanish Ladies". The song is also known as "Augathella Station". It is numbered 21114 on the Roud Folk Song Index.

== History ==
The lyric dates back to at least the 1880s and is credited to a jackaroo-turned-shopkeeper named Saul Mendelsohn, who lived near Nanango. Mendelsohn was later found as being related to actor Ben Mendelsohn via a 2009 episode of the television series, Who Do You Think You Are.

The place names used in the song were part of the route that cattle drovers used when returning from cattle sales in Brisbane to the cattle station at Augathella in South West Queensland. Those place names include Toowong, Augathella, Caboolture, Kilcoy, Colinton's Hut, Blackbutt, Bob Williamson's paddock, Taromeo, Yarraman Creek, Nanango and Toomancie.

== Text and music ==
Farewell and adieu to you, Brisbane ladies,
farewell and adieu, you maids of Toowong.
We've sold all our cattle and we have to get a movin',
but we hope we shall see you again before long.

Chorus:
We'll rant and we'll roar like true Queensland drovers,
we'll rant and we'll roar as onward we push
until we return to the Augathella station.
Oh, it's flamin' dry goin' through the old Queensland bush.

The first camp we make, we shall call it the Quart Pot,
Caboolture, then Kilcoy, and Colinton's Hut,
we'll pull up at the Stone House, Bob Williamson's paddock,
and early next morning we cross the Blackbutt.

Chorus

Then on to Taromeo and Yarraman Creek, lads,
it's there we shall make our next camp for the day,
where the water and grass are both plenty and sweet, lads,
and maybe we'll butcher a fat little stray.

Chorus

Then on to Nanango, that hard-bitten township (Note: This is the version collected by A. L. Lloyd Older versions have the more favourable: Next night through Nanango - the jolly old township "Good day to you, lads" with a hearty shake hands "Come on, this is my shout! Well here's to your next trip And we hope you will step in tonight at our dance.)
where the out-of-work station-hands sit in the dust,
where the shearers get shorn by old Tim, the contractor.
Oh, I wouldn't go near there, but I flaming well must!

Chorus

The girls of Toomancie, (Note: Or 'Toomancy') they look so entrancing,
like bawling young heifers they're out for their fun,
with the waltz and the polka and all kinds of dancing
to the rackety old banjo of Bob Anderson.

Chorus

Then fill up your glasses, and drink to the lasses,
we'll drink this town dry, then farewell to them all,
and when we've got back to the Augathella Station,
we hope you'll come by there and pay us a call.

== Recordings ==
"Brisbane Ladies" has been performed and recorded by a number of various Australian artists, including bush bands.

- Snake Gully Bush Band
- The Wild Colonial Boys
- John Greenway on the 1959 album Australian Folksongs and Ballads
- Gary Shearston on the 1964 album Folk Songs and Ballads of Australia
- The Bushwackers, under the title of "Augathella Station" on the album Murrumbidgee
- Hoyt Axton recorded "Brisbane Ladies" on his album Greenback Dollar, Live at the Troubadour
