= Dodman Point =

Headland on the south coast of Cornwall, England

Dodman Point Penn Ardh (Cornish)
- Headland
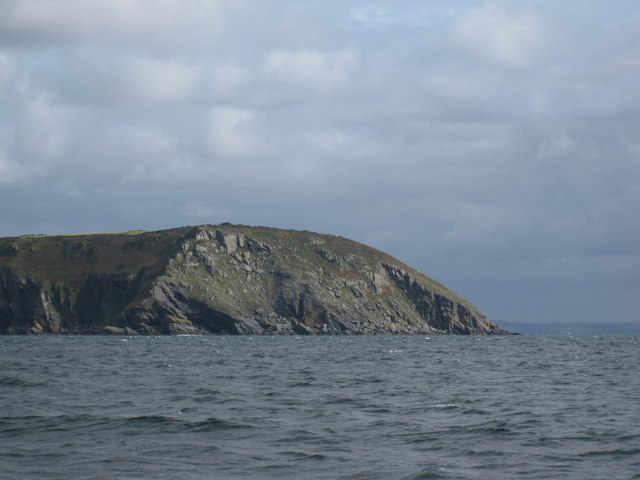
- Dodman Point from the south west

- Location within Cornwall
- Coordinates: 50°13′10″N 4°48′07″W
- Location: Cornwall
- Operator: National Trust
- Elevation: 113.96 m (373.88 ft)
- Designation: Scheduled monument
- Website: www.nationaltrust.org.uk/the-dodman

Dodman Point (Cornish: Penn Ardh) near Mevagissey is the highest headland on the south Cornwall coast, measuring 374 feet (114 m). It is also known by its earlier names of the Deadman and Deadman's Point. It hosts the remains of an Iron Age promontory fort, and at its seaward end is "Parson Martin's Cross" – a large granite cross erected in 1896 to encourage those involved in Christian service, and which aids navigation around the headland. Dodman Point is mentioned in the shanty Spanish Ladies.

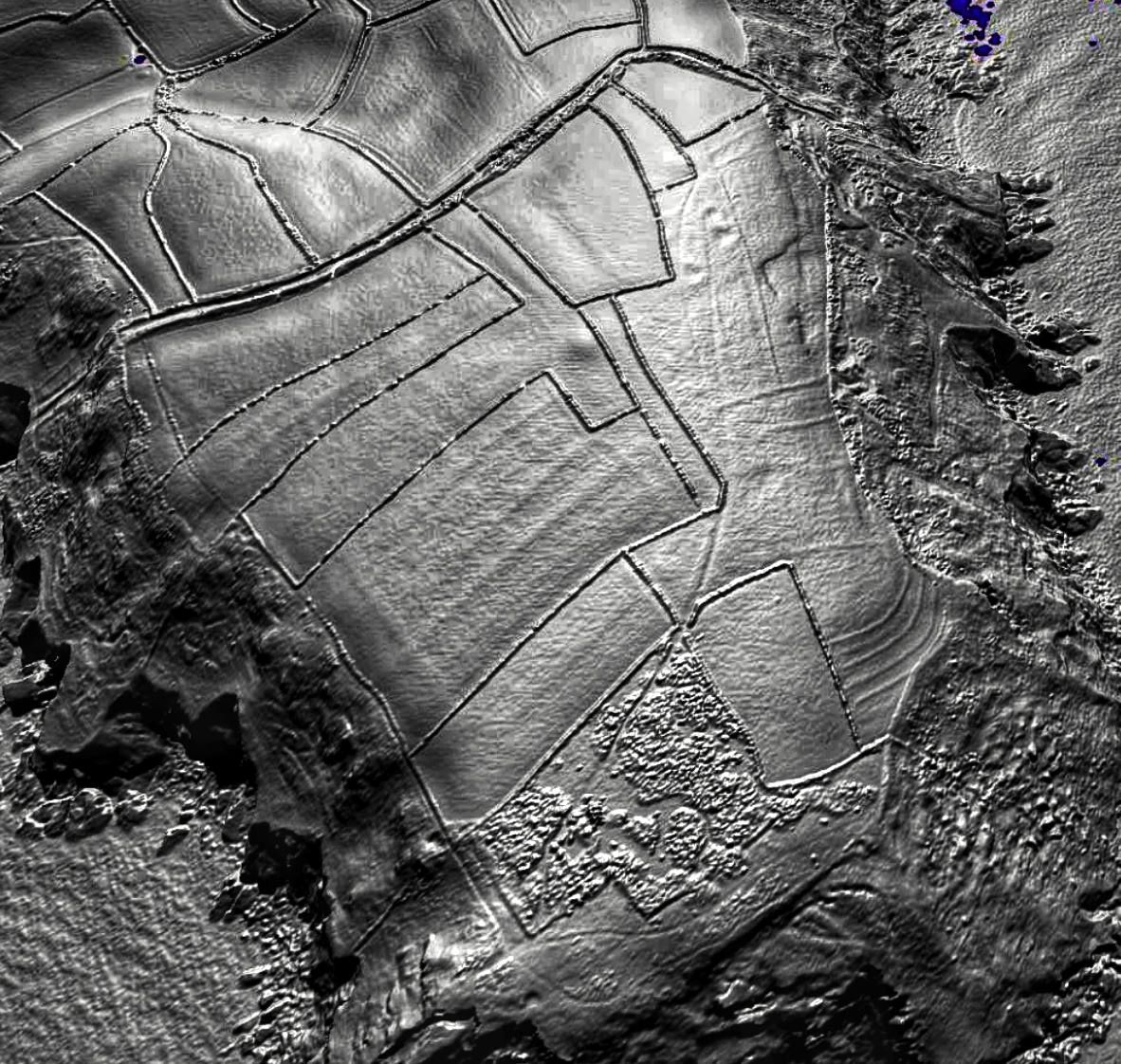
A lidar view of Dodman Point revealing a range of features.

To its north-east and in its lee is the small anchorage and sand beach of Gorran Haven.

Below the large stone cross, there is a way down to the bottom of the small cliffs and there is some climbing there on the faces – mainly bouldering as it is rarely scaled so there are no fixed anchor points.

== Gallery ==
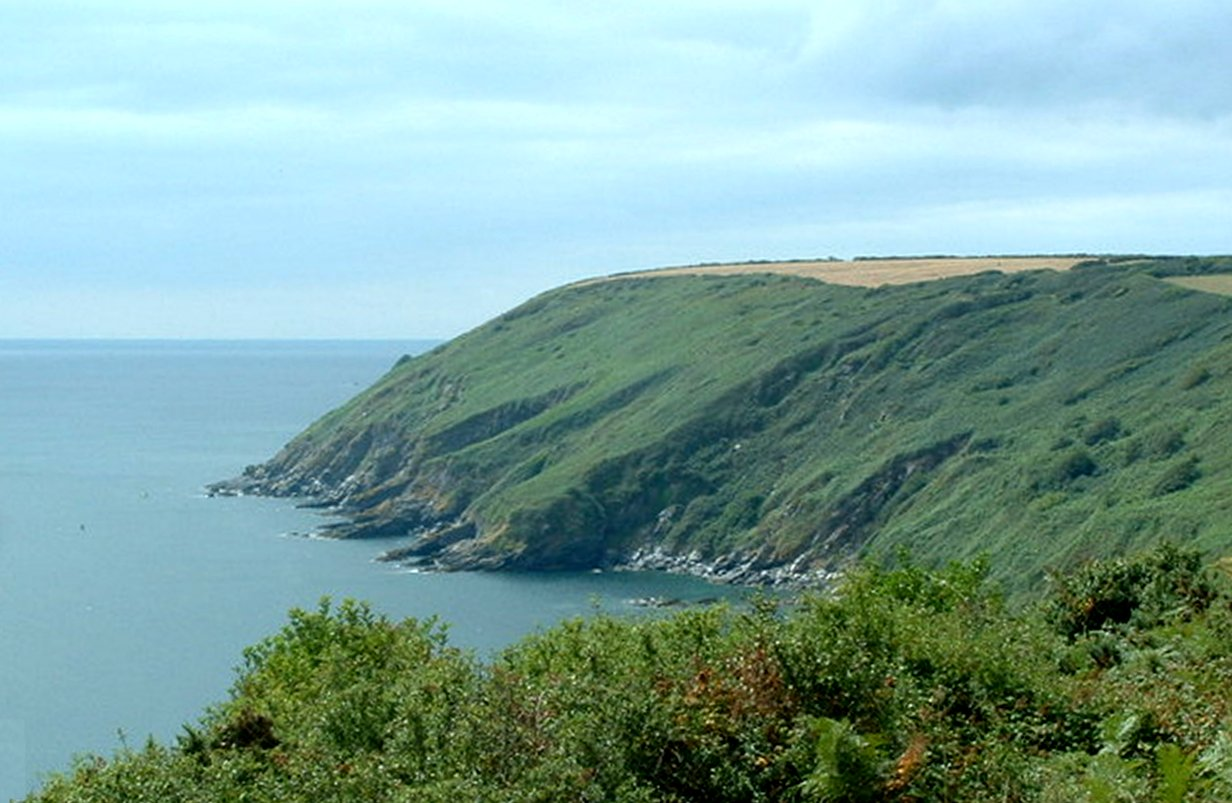
Viewed from the east

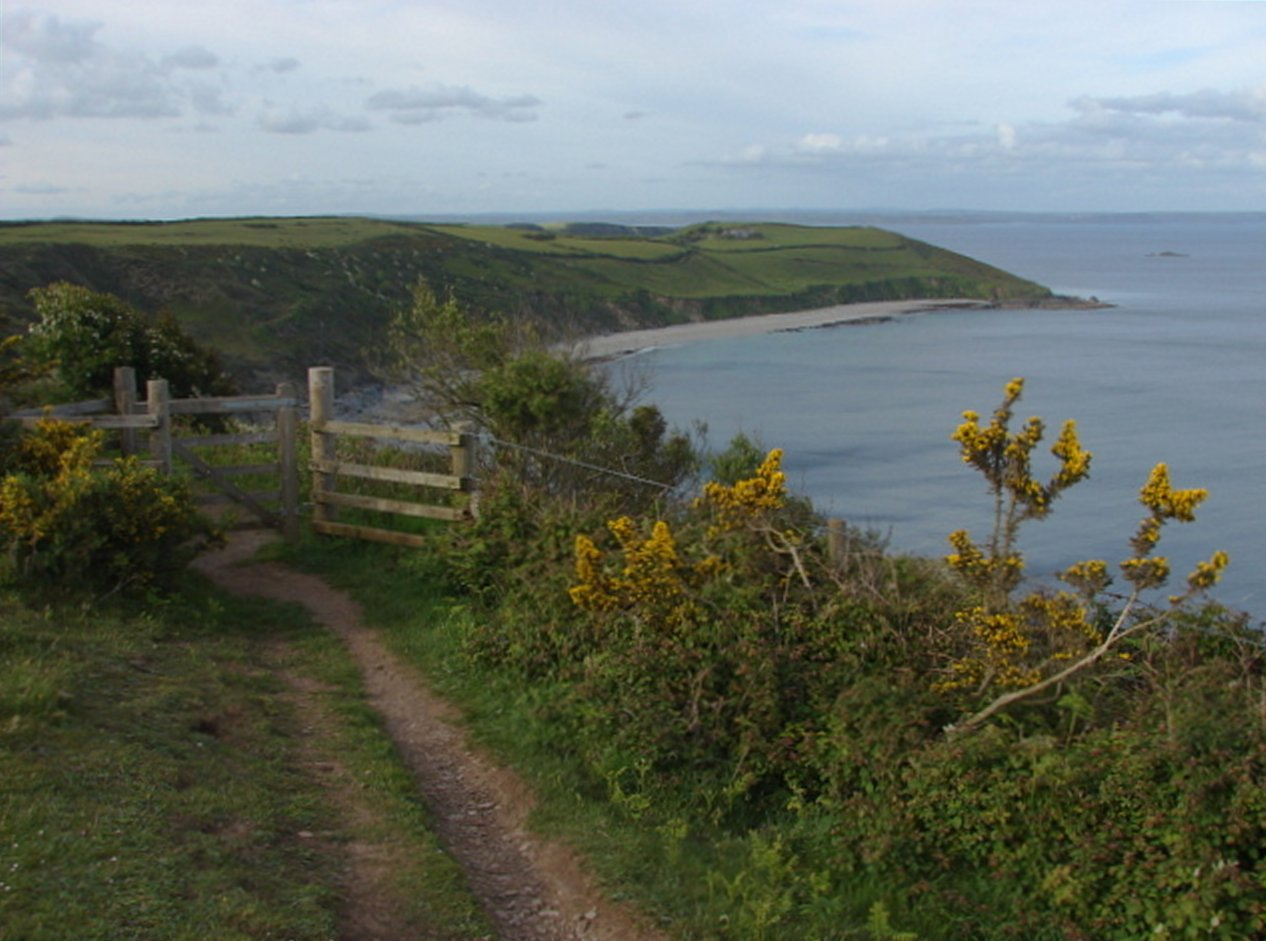
Viewed from the west

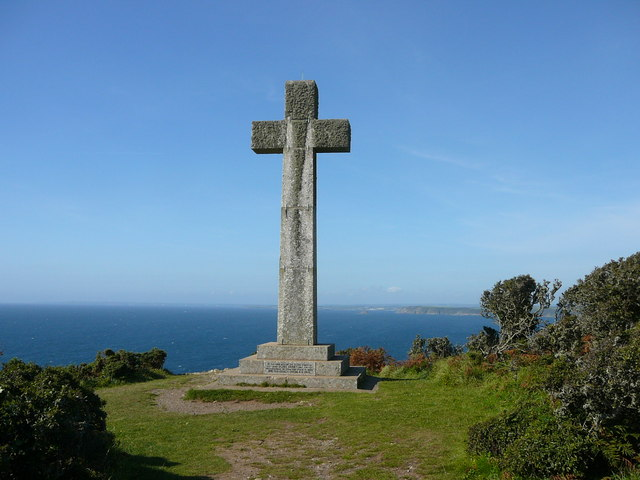
Parson Martin's Cross

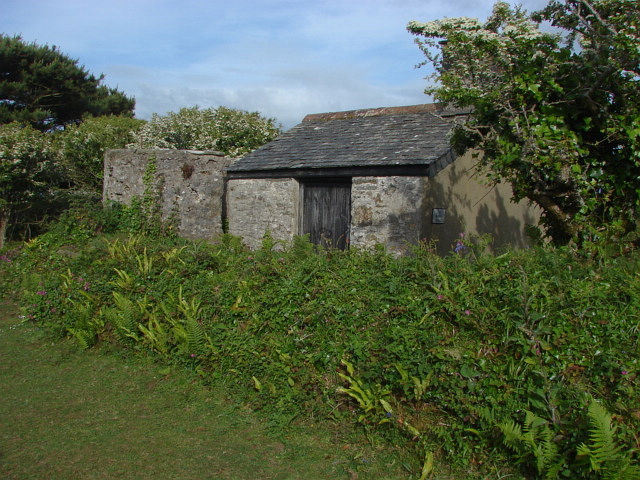
The Watch House

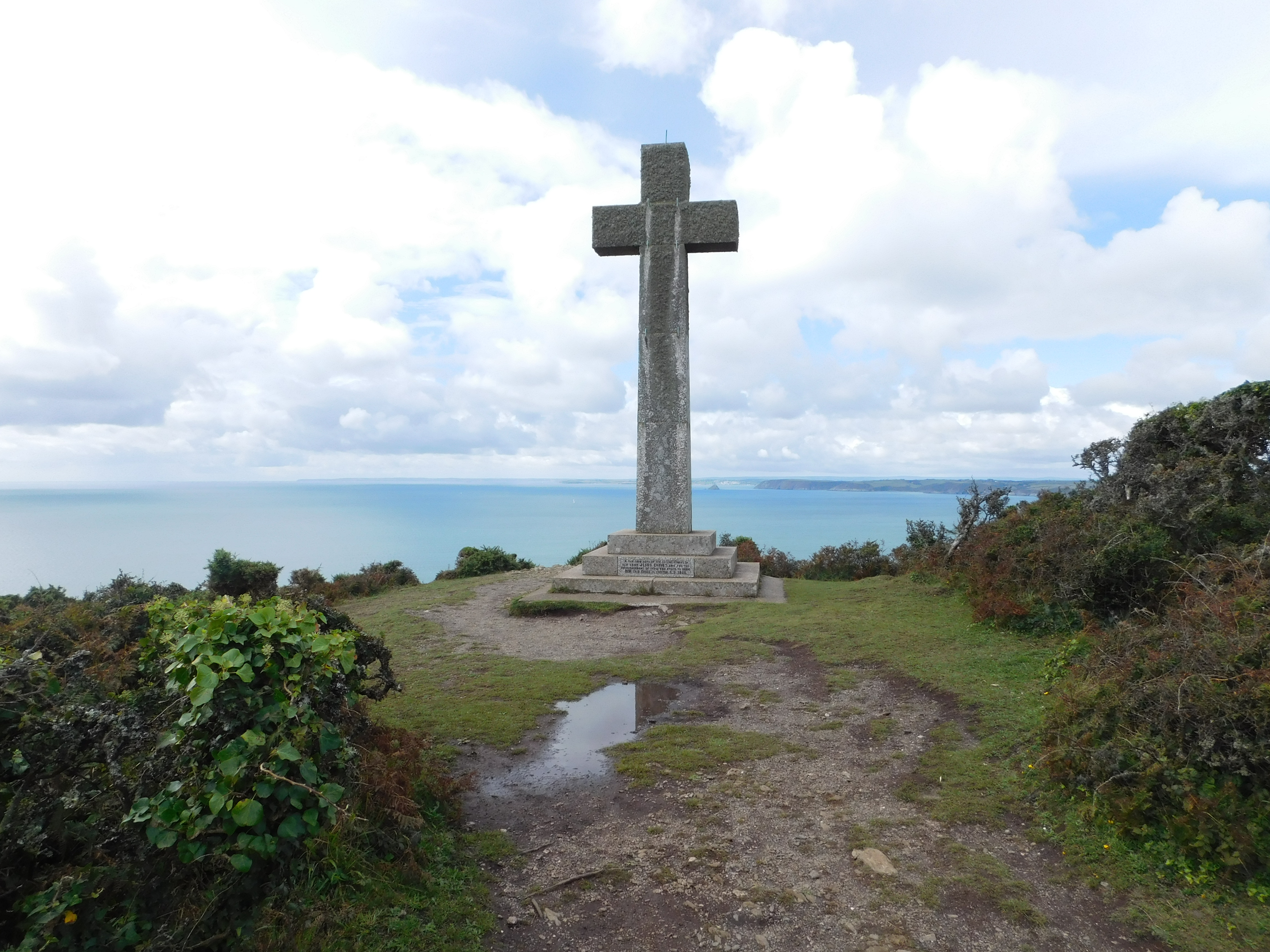
Parson Martin's Cross
