= HMS Tanatside =

Destroyer of the Royal Navy

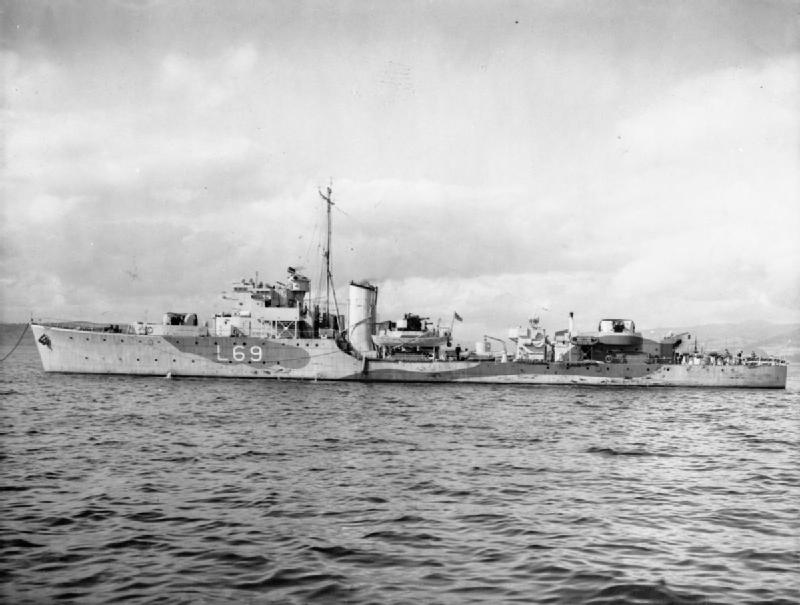

History

United Kingdom
- Name: HMS Tanatside
- Ordered: 23 August 1940
- Builder: Yarrow Shipbuilders
- Laid down: 23 June 1941
- Launched: 30 April 1942
- Commissioned: August 1942
- Out of service: Loaned to the Royal Hellenic Navy in 1946
- Identification: pennant number: L69
- Honours and awards: ATLANTIC 1943 - ENGLISH CHANNEL 1943 - NORMANDY 1944 - BISCAY 1944
- Fate: Scrapped in January 1964
- Badge: On a Field per fess wavy White and Blue, an oak tree eradicated proper enfiled with a mural crown Gold.

Greece
- Name: Adrias
- Identification: Pennant number: D06
- Fate: Returned to the Royal Navy in August 1962

General characteristics
- Class & type: Hunt-class destroyer
- Displacement: 1,050 long tons (1,070 t) standard; 1,435 long tons (1,458 t) full load
- Length: 85.3 m (279 ft 10 in) o/a
- Beam: 10.16 m (33 ft 4 in)
- Draught: 3.51 m (11 ft 6 in)
- Propulsion: 2 Admiralty 3-drum boilers; 2 shaft Parsons geared turbines, 19,000 shp
- Speed: 27 knots (31 mph; 50 km/h); 25.5 kn (29.3 mph; 47.2 km/h) full
- Range: 2,350 nmi (4,350 km) at 20 kn (37 km/h)
- Complement: 168
- Armament: 4 × QF 4 in Mark XVI guns on twin mounts Mk. XIX; 4 × QF 2 pdr Mk. VIII on quad mount MK.VII; 2 × 20 mm Oerlikons on single mounts P Mk. III; 2 × 21 in (533 mm) torpedo tubes; 110 depth charges, 4 throwers, 3 racks

HMS Tanatside was a Hunt-class destroyer of the Royal Navy. She was launched at Yarrow in April 1942. Ships of this class were designed as cheap, easily built vessels for convoy escort and antisubmarine duties. She was named like her sisters after a fox hunt, in her case one in North Wales. War bonds were issued to finance the building of warships. Tanatside was funded by people from Tregaron, Aberaeron, New Quay, Aberystwyth and Teifiside, in a nod to the ship's name. Plaques were presented to each of these townships. During a Warship Week held between 14 and 21 March 1942 the civil community of the Welsh county of Cardiganshire adopted the ship.

== Service history ==
Tanatside took part in Operation Tunnel anti shipping forays and was present at Omaha Beach, where she approached the beach to assist in the destruction of German defences. In December 1945 Tanatside was reduced to care and maintenance at Malta.

== Greek service ==
In 1946 she was transferred to the Greek Navy and renamed Adrias. She was removed from the effective list in 1963 and scrapped in 1964.

== Publications ==
- Colledge, J. J.; Warlow, Ben (2006) [1969]. Ships of the Royal Navy: The Complete Record of All Fighting Ships of the Royal Navy from the 15th Century to the Present (3rd Rev ed.). London: Chatham Publishing. ISBN 978-1-86176-281-8. OCLC 67375475.
- English, John (1987). The Hunts: a history of the design, development and careers of the 86 destroyers of this class built for the Royal and Allied Navies during World War II. England: World Ship Society. ISBN 0-905617-44-4.
