= Cathead =

Wooden beam supporting a ship's anchor

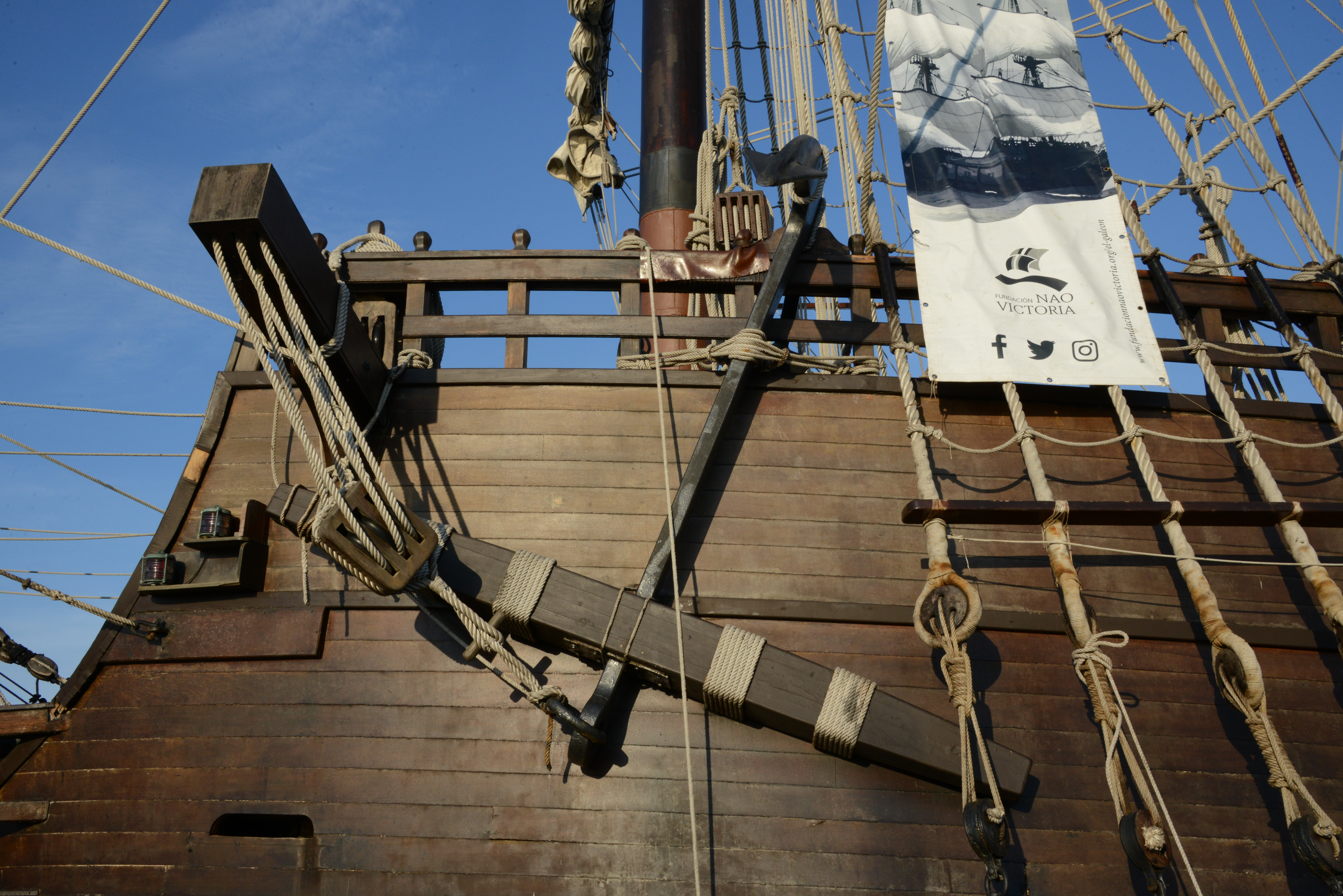
An anchor secured to the ship's side. The projecting beam the anchor hangs from when not secured is a cathead (left). The anchor has a stock (cross-piece, in this case wooden) below, and curved flukes above (end-on); the shank is the near-vertical metal bar running between them, lashed with the shank painter

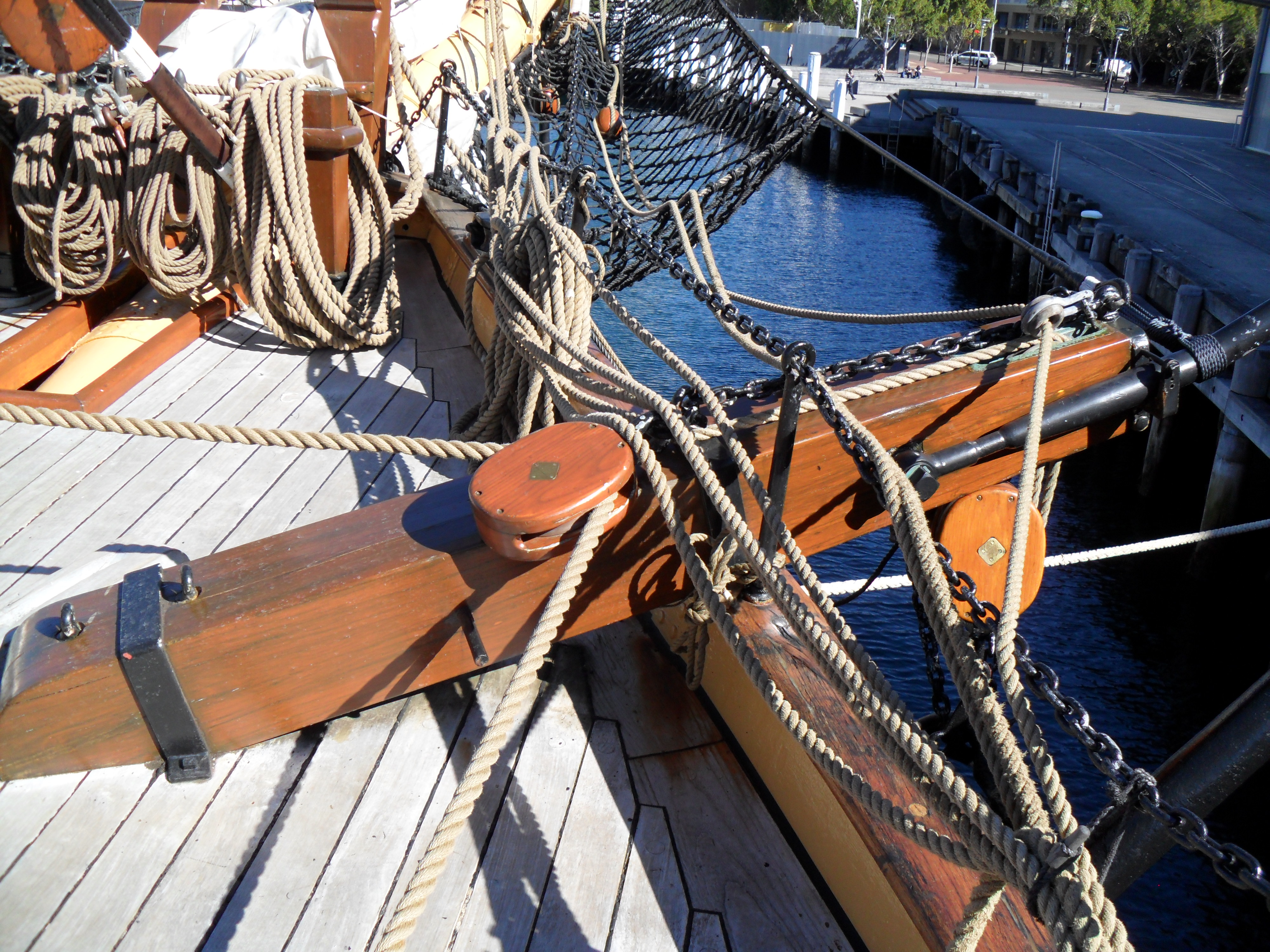
Cathead on bow of the barque James Craig; the cat tail protrudes onto the deck and is fastened to the cat-beam.

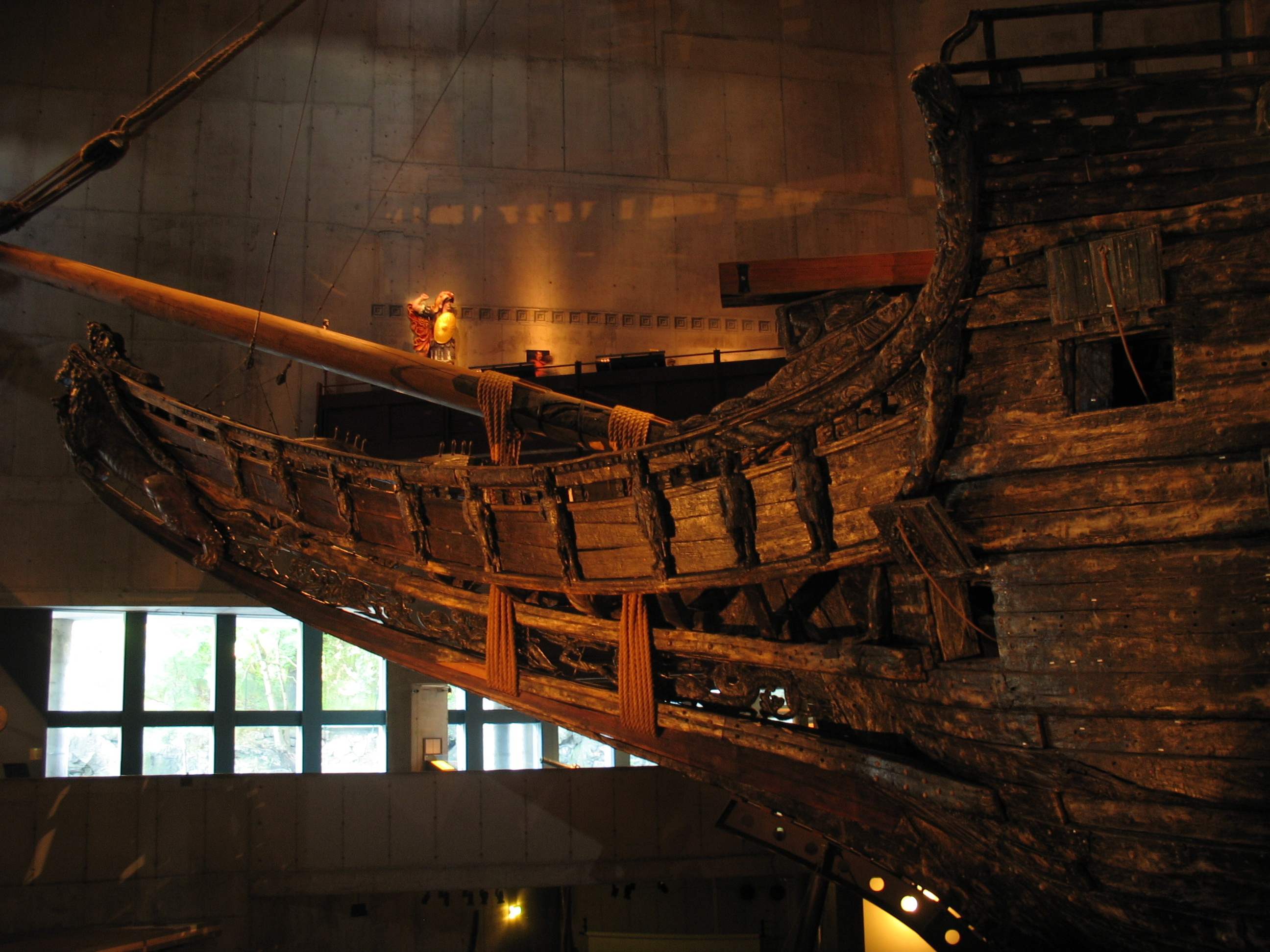
The 17th century warship Vasa with cathead visible upper middle right

A cathead is a large wooden beam located on either side of the bow of a sailing ship, and angled forward at roughly 45 degrees. The beam is used to support the ship's anchor when raising it (weighing anchor) or lowering it (letting go), and for carrying the anchor on its stock-end when suspended outside the ship's side. The cathead is furnished with sheaves at the outer end, and the inner end (which is called the cat's-tail) fits down on the cat-beam. The shank painter is a short rope or chain by which the shank of an anchor is held fast to a ship's side when not in use. The process of securing the anchor is called catting and fishing it. The cat stopper also fastens the anchor on. The purpose of the cathead is to provide both a heavy enough beam to support the massive weight of the anchor, and to hold the metal anchor away from the wooden side of the ship to prevent damage when the anchor is being raised from the water. The stockless anchor made the cathead obsolete.

In common practice, the projecting end of the beam was carved to resemble the face of a lion or cat. Whether such carving was due to a play on the already existing name of the beam or whether the beam was so named because of the practice of such carving is unknown.

The origin of the term "cathead" is obscure, but dates at least to the 17th century, as it was used by Mainwaring and Boteler in their dictionaries. The Mainwaring dictionary was written in 1623.

Nautical author Robert Charles Leslie, writes: "The term catheads used for the two stout projecting timbers on either bow, from which the anchor hung clear of the ship before letting go, was no doubt connected with the fact of a lion or large cat usually carved upon the end of the item."

== Additional nautical use of the term ==
A second "cat head" was associated with a ship's anchor-cable and windlass. This was a square pin thrust into one of the handspike holes of a ship's windlass. When at anchor, the anchor rope (called a cable or catfall) was secured to this with a smaller rope tie called a seizing. The English term for this pin was 'Norman'. In German, however, it was called a Kattenkopf (cat-head), and in this case it is a reference to the traditional way the top was notched and chamfered off so that in cross section, it resembled the ears of a cat.
