= HMS Hussar =

Ten ships of the Royal Navy have been named HMS Hussar, after the hussar.

- The first HMS Hussar (1727) was a 28-gun sixth rate launched in 1757 and captured by the French in 1762 after running aground off Cape François, Hispaniola due to the negligence of the pilot and the master.
- The second HMS Hussar (1763) was a 28-gun sixth rate launched in 1763 and wrecked on 24 November 1780 while trying to negotiate the Hell Gate passage near New York City. Hussar settled to the bottom, with her masts above water, on the Bronx (north) side of the channel shore. Rumors that she was carrying thousands of pounds in gold coin have never been confirmed, and repeated attempts to salvage the wreck have proven unsuccessful.
- The third Hussar was an American galley captured in 1778 and sold 1786. This Hussar may be the same Hussar galley built in Philadelphia during the 1777–1778 British occupation on the orders of Captain Sir Andrew Hammond to the Loyalists. It was used during the Battle of Red Bank and at Fort Mifflin under Lord Cornwallis.
- The fourth Hussar was the Massachusetts Navy's 26-gun sixth-rate Protector, of 586 tons (bm), launched in 1779 at Newburyport, Massachusetts, that HMS Roebuck and HMS Medea captured on 5 May 1781; the Royal Navy renamed her HMS Hussar and sold her in 1783. The Danish East India Company purchased her.
- The fifth HMS Hussar (1784) was a 28-gun sixth rate launched in 1784 and wrecked on 27 December 1796 when a strong storm drove her onshore about 15 miles west of the Île de Batz.
- The sixth HMS Hussar (1798) was a 14-gun sloop, originally the French privateer Hussard, captured in 1798 and sold 1800.
- The seventh HMS Hussar (1799) was a 38-gun fifth rate launched in 1799 and wrecked on 8 February 1804 by grounding on a reef near the Île de Sein. Her crew burnt her and most escaped in fishing vessels they commandeered from the islanders.
- The eighth HMS Hussar (1807) was a 46-gun fifth rate launched 1807 and used in 1861 as a target.
- The ninth HMS Hussar (1894) was a torpedo gunboat in service from 1894 to 1920.
- The tenth HMS Hussar (J82) was a minesweeper launched in 1934 and accidentally sunk in 1944 off Normandy by Royal Air Force aircraft.
