= Poor Jack =

1840 novel by Frederick Marryat

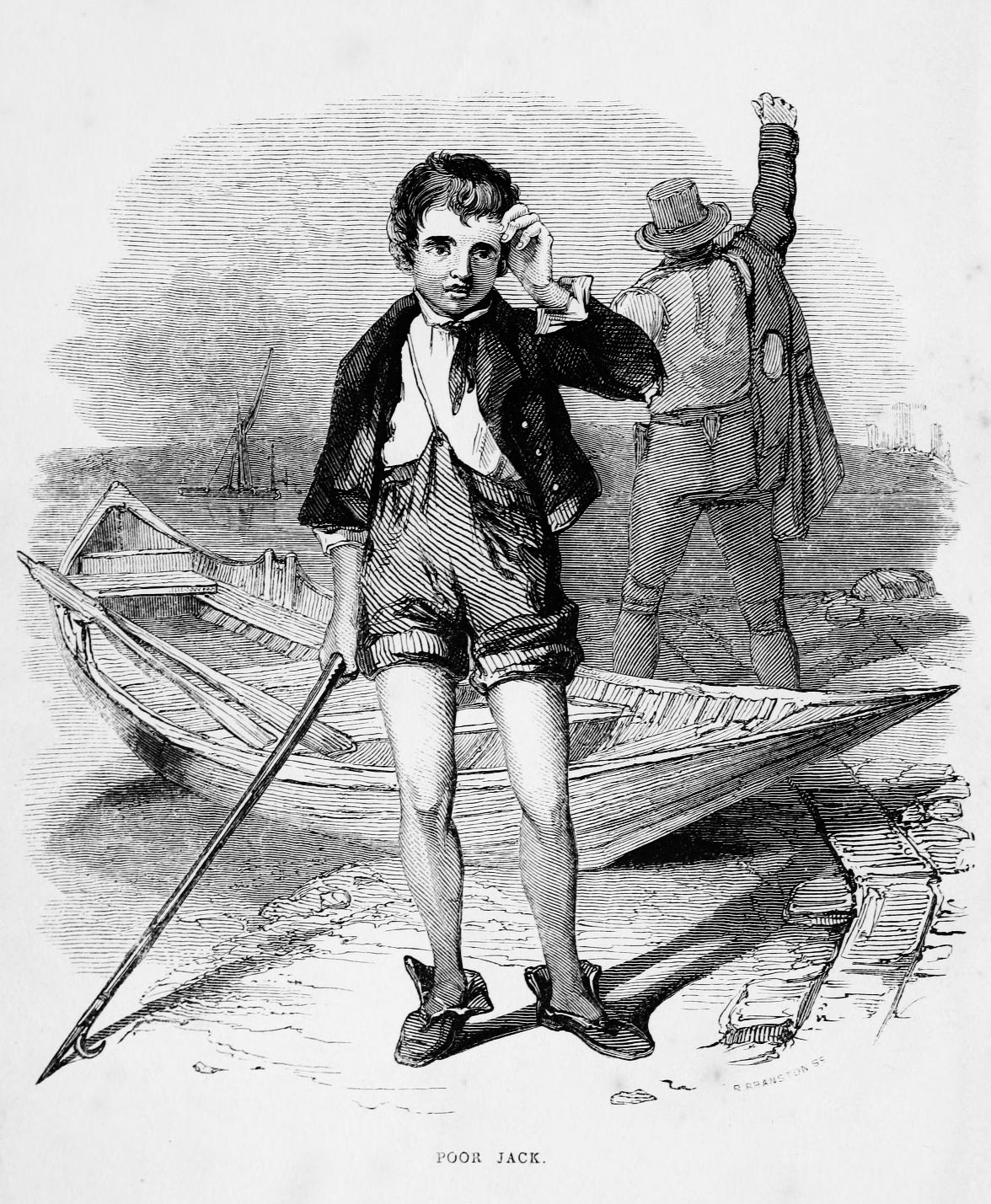
First edition frontispiece

Poor Jack is a novel by the English author Frederick Marryat, published in 1840.

== Plot ==
It tells the story of Thomas Saunders, a sailor's son and neglected street urchin struggling to survive in Greenwich, London in the early 19th century. ("Poor Jack" was the title given by the waterfront boys, or mudlarks, to their chief.) In a rags-to-riches story Saunders eventually rises by his own efforts to become a pilot on the Thames, makes his fortune and retires to the life of a wealthy squire. The novel has interesting descriptions of domestic life among the naval lower ranks and contains many anecdotes of seafaring life.
