= Recruitment in the British Army =

1855–1865 painting of two British Army recruiting sergeants in an English village

The British Army came into being with the unification of the Kingdoms of England and Scotland into the Kingdom of Great Britain in 1707. The new British Army incorporated Regiments that had already existed in England and Scotland. The Army has traditionally relied on volunteer recruits, the only exceptions to this being during the latter part of the First World War until 1919, and then again during the Second World War when conscription was brought in during the war and stayed until 1960.

== 18th and 19th centuries ==
At the beginning of the 18th century, the standing strength of the British Army was reduced after the Treaty of Ryswick, and stood at 7,000 troops at home and 14,000 based overseas, with recruits ranging from 17 to 50 years of age. The army was kept small by the government during peacetime, mainly due to the fear that the army would be unduly influenced by the Crown or used to depose the government. The Bill of Rights of 1689 specifies that Parliamentary authority is needed to maintain a standing army in peacetime.

For much of the 18th century, the army was recruited in a wide variety of places, and its manpower was additionally supplemented by auxiliaries from continental Europe, including Danes, Hessians and Hanoverians. These auxiliaries were hired out by other states on contracted terms. Other regiments were formed of volunteers such as French Huguenots. By 1709, during the War of the Spanish Succession, British forces totalled 150,000 men, of whom 81,000 were foreign mercenaries of variable quality. The rest of the army consisted of natives of the British Isles who, apart from the officers, were mainly recruited from the poorest sections of society. Each regiment was responsible for the recruitment of its own troops, and individual colonels would lead recruiting parties on tours of the towns and villages. This was emphasized by a popular play of the time called The Recruiting Officer. Other powers were given by the British government to allow the forcible enlistment of vagrants and vagabonds. Some of these powers were abused by recruiting officers desperate to fill their quotas, although a legalized Royal Navy press-gang system would not be implemented yet, even though normal recruiting methods failed to supply the required annual influx of troops, as the army was not a popular profession, with low pay, flogging and other barbarous disciplinary measures. The army's recruiting methods and treatment of its soldiers would remain the same for the rest of the 18th century.

1780 caricature of three working class men being enlisted into the British Army

During the American War of Independence, a policy similar to the Royal Navy's use of impressment was introduced. Two acts were passed, the Recruiting Act 1778 and the Recruiting Act 1779, for the impressment of individuals into the army. For some men this would have been for being drunk and disorderly. The chief advantages of these acts was in the number of volunteers brought in under the apprehension of impressment. To avoid impressment, some recruits incapacitated themselves by cutting off the thumb and forefinger of the right hand. Both acts were repealed in 1780. The British Government also released criminals and debtors from prison on the condition they joined the army. Three entire regiments during the American Revolution were raised from this early release programme. Of the Volunteer recruits, some would find they had been enticed to take the King's shilling under false pretenses and many men would find they had signed to a lifetime in the army. Following the end of the American War of the Independence in 1783 the British Army fell into dereliction (having already been in a poor state in 1775), morale and discipline were low, and troops levels fell. The Army was neglected as never before and its total strength in 1793 stood at 40,000 men.

=== French Revolutionary and Napoleonic Wars ===
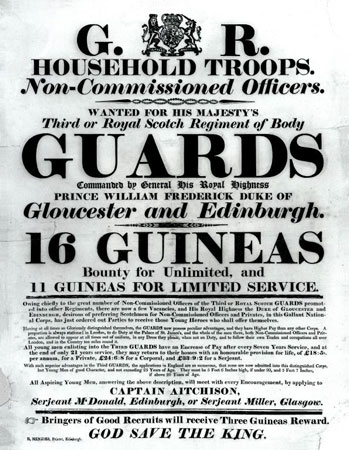
British Army recruitment poster during the Napoleonic Wars

Britain's 22-year struggle with France during the French Revolutionary and Napoleonic Wars required the British Army to expand rapidly. Ordinary recruiting methods failed to supply the number of men required to fill the Army ranks. The main methods used for recruiting were: private individuals were recruited for their own interests, volunteers from the militia and placing obligations on communities to enlist. Generals called for conscription for the first time in British history, although this was never enacted for the regular army. During this period, Great Britain was at a disadvantage to her enemy, as due to the Industrial Revolution potential recruits were instead drawn to the cities to earn more money in the many factories now being built in the country, while France was still largely an agrarian society.

Competition from civilian occupations was intense and highlighted in the disparity in pay; where a private could earn 7s per week in 1806, a dockworker could expect to earn 28s. However soldiers would expect to supplement this meagre income with promotion and loot on campaign. During the early phases of the war, joining the Army could still mean effectively joining for life, which was frequently brutally cut short. For instance, a posting to the Caribbean in 1790 was seen as a near death sentence, as thousands of men died or were disabled by disease there. The Army still struggled to raise the troops required to replace the discharged, wounded and dead as the war against France continued. As early as 1794, 18,596 soldiers died on active service and another 40,639 men were discharged. This would remain a constant theme during the Napoleonic Wars, and the British Army also used foreign volunteers, such as French Royalists, Germans, Greeks and Corsicans to supplement its forces. In 1813 one fifth of the army, 52,000 men, were such volunteers. The British Army in 1813 contained over 250,000 men, though this was much larger in comparison to the army at the beginning of the war, the all volunteer British army was still much smaller than that of France, which with conscription had an army over 2.6 million.

==== Reform ====
From 1798 onwards, structural, training and logistical reforms implemented or authorised by the Duke of York (as commander-in-chief of the army) slowly improved the lot of the ordinary soldier. York oversaw a crackdown on corruption and removed the threat of corporal punishment for a large number of petty offences (while it was still retained for serious derelictions of duty). He also stamped down on the abuse of buying officer commissions, making it necessary for officers to serve two full years before either promotion or purchase to captain and six years before becoming a major The establishment of the Royal Military Academy for officers was instigated due to York's influence, while regular recruits to the army were allowed to join under contract for limited periods, rather than for life. Men such as Sir John Moore, Thomas Sydney Beckwith and Rowland Hill characterised the new breed of officers who sought to improve the relationship between officers and men, motivating troops through mutual respect, reward and promotion rather than by largely relying on the threat of punishment. The Shorncliffe System for light infantry was established, being devised by Lt-Col Kenneth Mackenzie, and trained soldiers to think for themselves and act on initiative while the light infantry officers drilled alongside the men fostering comradeship. In addition, the introduction of new tactical and organisational flexibility contributed a great deal to the successes of the Peninsula and Waterloo.

=== Post-Napoleonic army ===
After the victory in the Napoleonic wars, there followed 40 years of peace in Europe during which the army would again revert to its peacetime role. The Army that won the war was again neglected in the peace. The Government's immediate priority was to cut taxes, to lessen the burden of taxation on the economy, which had remained high over the previous 20 years, to pay for the expensive war that enabled Britain to be victorious over France. The British Army funding would be cut drastically in the short term, but as became evident this would apply for the next 40 years. The budget was cut from £43 million in 1815, to £10.7 million in 1820, £8 million in 1836 and only rose slightly 10 years later to £9.5 million. With the budget cuts, troop levels were inevitably cut from 233,592 men in 1815 to 102,529 men by 1828. There were further reductions in 1838, after which troop strength stood at 91,388. With the constant cuts, recruiting parties would achieve their reduced recruiting targets with greater ease.

=== 1870 reforms ===
The army during peacetime was deliberately kept small and the recruitment methods would only change once the Cardwell reforms were implemented in the 1870s. The Crimean War nevertheless highlighted several defects and weaknesses in the Army's organisation. Although in theory, 70,000 soldiers were stationed in Britain, it was found that this number included several units in transit from distant outposts of the Empire, and some underdeveloped recruits and many old soldiers whose constitution had been ruined by harsh climate and disease and who were no longer capable of serving in the field. As a result, the provision of an expeditionary force of only 25,000 in the Crimea stripped Britain of almost every trained soldier.

Some of the Cardwell's reforms included the abolition of sale of commissions, the banning of flogging and other measures, such as reducing the length of service, to make recruitment more appealing. An Enlistment Act saw a change in the terms of enlistment, which could at last produce some trained reserves and also made soldiering a more tempting career. A Localisation Scheme resulted in the pairing of single-battalion regiments via administrative depots on a county-based system.

== First World War ==
One of the most famous recruiting posters of the British Army; from World War I featuring Kitchener.

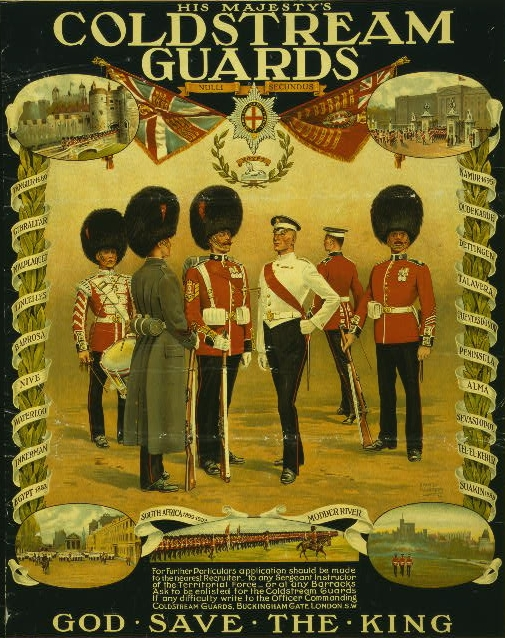
A Coldstream Guards poster from World War I

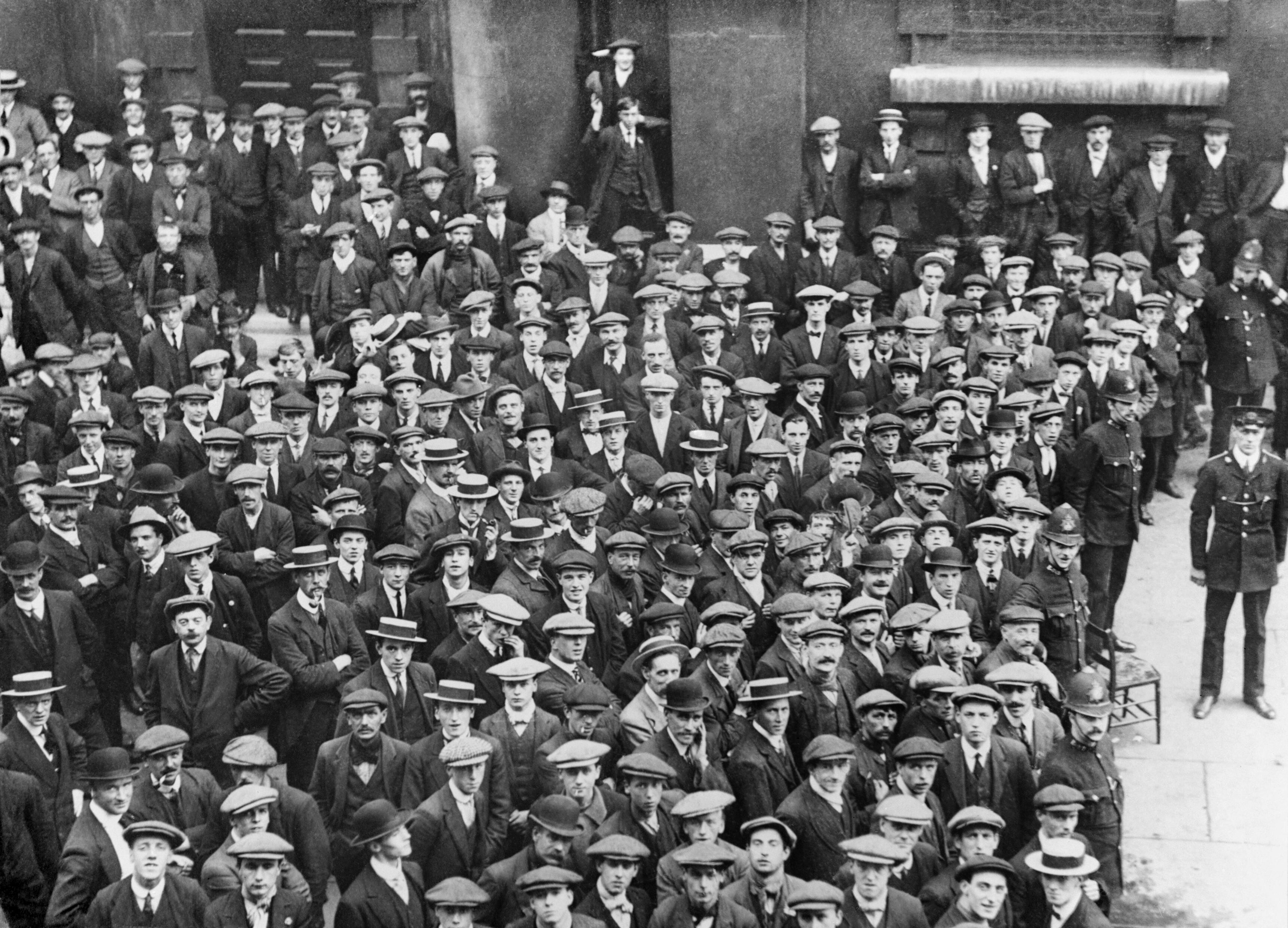
British Volunteer recruits in London, August 1914, who would form Kitchener's New Army

At the start of 1914, the British Army had a reported strength of 710,000 men including reserves, of which 247,432 were regular troops, also including 80,000 regular troops formed as the British Expeditionary Force. The recruitment drive would be spearheaded by Lord Kitchener once war had been declared in August 1914.

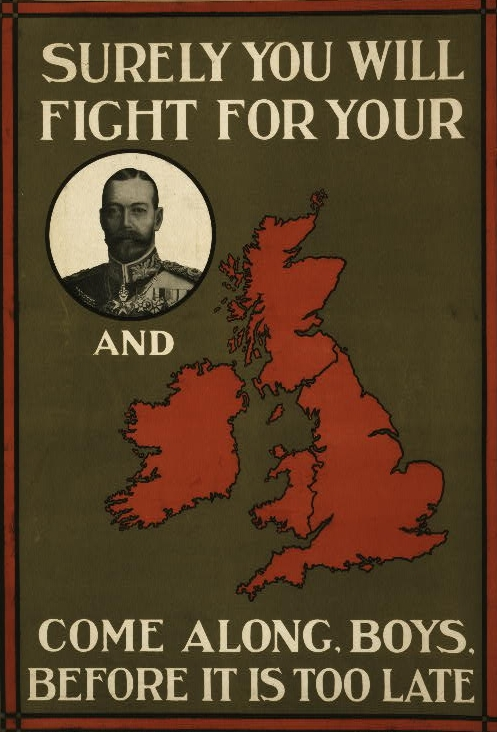
World War I recruitment poster

At the outset of war young Britons answered the call, for King and Country, and voluntarily joined the British Army. By early 1915 much of the regular army had been killed and was now replaced by the part-time volunteers of the Territorial Force and Kitchener's new volunteer army. A feature of the volunteer army was the Pals battalions, recruited from single communities or even factories, who were allowed to serve together. The Kitchener recruitment campaign had proved to be very successful, as on 1 September 1914, over 30,000 men enlisted. With each day passing, thousands more were clamouring to be taken. The British Government soon realised the main drawback of this campaign, as opposed to the French and German conscriptions, which selected men individually, was that a high proportion of men from skilled industries left their work, which would prove to be costly to the war effort. A better-controlled enlistment programme would be required.

The Military Service Bill was enacted with effect from January 1916 and specified that men from the ages of 18 to 41 were liable to be called up for service unless they were married (or widowed with children), or else served in one of a number of reserved professions. By the end of World War I, almost a quarter of the total male population of the United Kingdom of Great Britain and Ireland had joined up, over five million men.

== Inter-war period 1919–38 ==
After the Great war and the inevitable defence cuts that would follow, the army was reduced in size, and by 1920 had fallen to a strength of 370,000. There were a number of factors for the reductions in the size of British Army, and the cuts to the budget of the Army. The army now had competition from the new armed service, the Royal Air Force, which could patrol far greater land areas, and keep the far flung corners of the Empire policed from the sky at a relatively cheaper cost. The defence budget for the army was repeatedly cut yearly, as in 1923 the army defence budget was 43.5 million pounds sterling, and during the Great Depression in 1932 to just under 36 million pounds sterling. Only with the rise of Germany, would the budget for the British army again increase, by 1938 to 123 million pounds sterling; the army again started a rapid recruitment program.

== Second World War ==
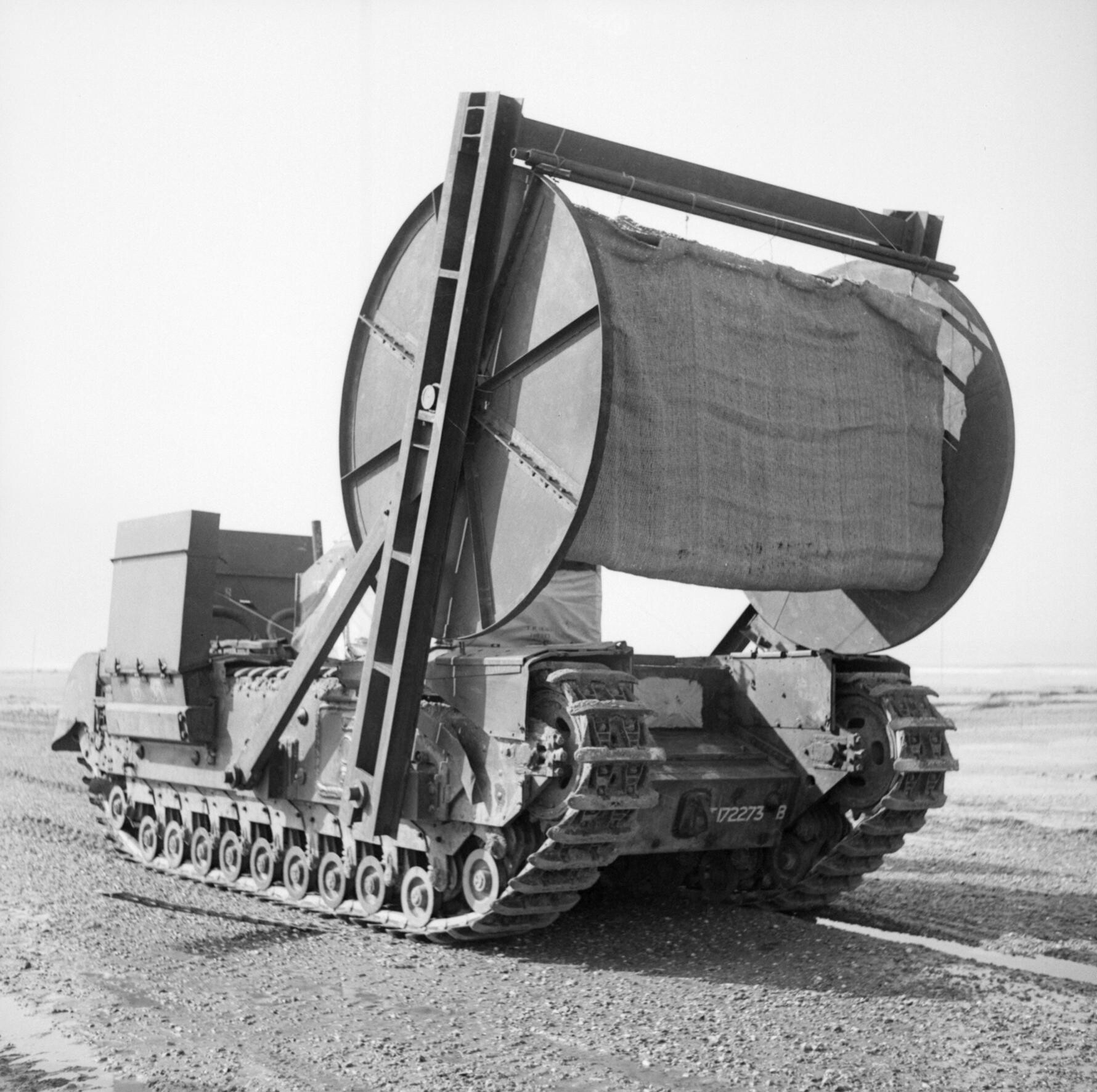
Skilled men were required to join the 1st Assault Brigade Royal Engineers manning this modified Churchill tank, and to carry out combat engineering and other technical support

The pre-war army was an all-volunteer army and recruits were allotted to the corps of their wishes. The only pre-conditions placed on candidates were an interview with a recruiting officer, who could only glean partial information on a recruit, a medical examination, and some educational tests. If these requirements were met, the recruit was posted to the arm of his choice, there was no scientific selection process unlike the rapidly growing German army. This led to men being allocated to the wrong or unsuitable corps. The Secretary of State for War, Leslie Hore-Belisha attempted to address these problems, and the wider problems of the British army. The process of allocating men would remain ad hoc at the start of the war. The army would be without the quotas of men required from skilled professions and trades, which modern warfare demanded. With the army being the least popular service compared to the navy and airforce, a higher proportion of army recruits were said to be dull and backward.

A memorandum to the Executive Committee of the Army Council highlighted the growing concern:

"The British Army is wasting manpower in this war almost as badly as it did in the last war. A man is posted to a Corps almost entirely on the demand of the moment and without any effort at personal selection by proper tests."

Only with the creation of the Beveridge committee in 1941, and their subsequent findings in 1942, would the situation of skilled men not being assigned correctly be addressed. The findings led directly to the creation of the General Service Corps, and would remain in place long after the war. Hore-Belisha had sought permission to introduce conscription in 1938 but was rebuffed by Neville Chamberlain, who would not agree to increased defence spending. In early 1939, he was finally allowed to introduce conscription to meet the threat of Germany, with the Military Training Act of 27 April 1939. The act required all men aged 20 and 21 to take six months military training. This act was extended on the declaration of the war, to include all fit men between the ages of 18 and 41. Conscription was gradually brought in, starting in October 1939 and applying to all fit men between 20–23, and the age group was increased as the war continued.

At the start of the Second World War, the British Army Strength stood at 897,000 men including reserves. By the end of 1939, the strength of the British Army stood at 1.1 million men, and further increased to 1.65 million men during June 1940, By the end of the war some 2.9 million men had served in the British Army.

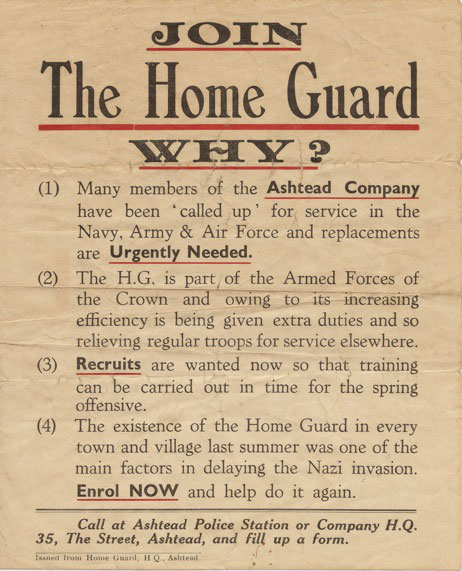
Recruitment poster for the Ashtead Home Guard

The Local Defence Volunteers was formed early in 1940. Very large numbers of civilians too old or too young for the Army, or barred from serving if they were in reserved occupations, volunteered for the new force. The organisation was eventually renamed the "Home Guard" and was to be part of the defence of Britain in the advent of a German invasion of Britain.

== Post-war period ==
As with the previous World War, the end of wartime conscription saw the army reduced in size and reverting to its peacetime role of maintaining the Empire. In 1947, British India was given Independence, which meant the loss of the British Indian Army and thousands of volunteer soldiers. The British Government had relied on the British Indian Army for Imperial matters. Now, without this army, the regular British Army was judged to be too small for the demands of an impending Cold War and maintaining the Empire. To meet this demand, which volunteers alone would not, peacetime conscription was enacted by the government and passed by the House of Commons in 1947. In the United Kingdom, it is this period of peacetime conscription that is usually referred to as 'National Service'. It remains the only period of peacetime conscription in UK history, apart from the periods immediately before and after World War II. The majority of National Servicemen went into the Army and, by 1951, National Servicemen made up half the force, leading to a reduced level of voluntary recruitment to the regular army. The last intake of National Servicemen took place in 1960, with the last National Serviceman being demobbed on 16 May 1963. The army reverted to an all professional volunteer service, which it remains to this day.

The decision to abolish National Service was taken in 1957 with the 1957 Defence White Paper, which led to an enormous reduction in the number of soldiers between 1958–63, from about 330,000 to 165,000 by the end of National Service. In the decades that followed, cuts in the Army were the constant theme, although they were never on a large scale until the end of the cold war. Between 1963 and 1992, strength was reduced to 153,000. In 1990, the Government started another defence review, which concluded with the Defence White Paper of 1992. In a post-Soviet world, the white paper would again further reduce the army by 50,000, effectively ending the British Army of the Rhine.

== Present day ==
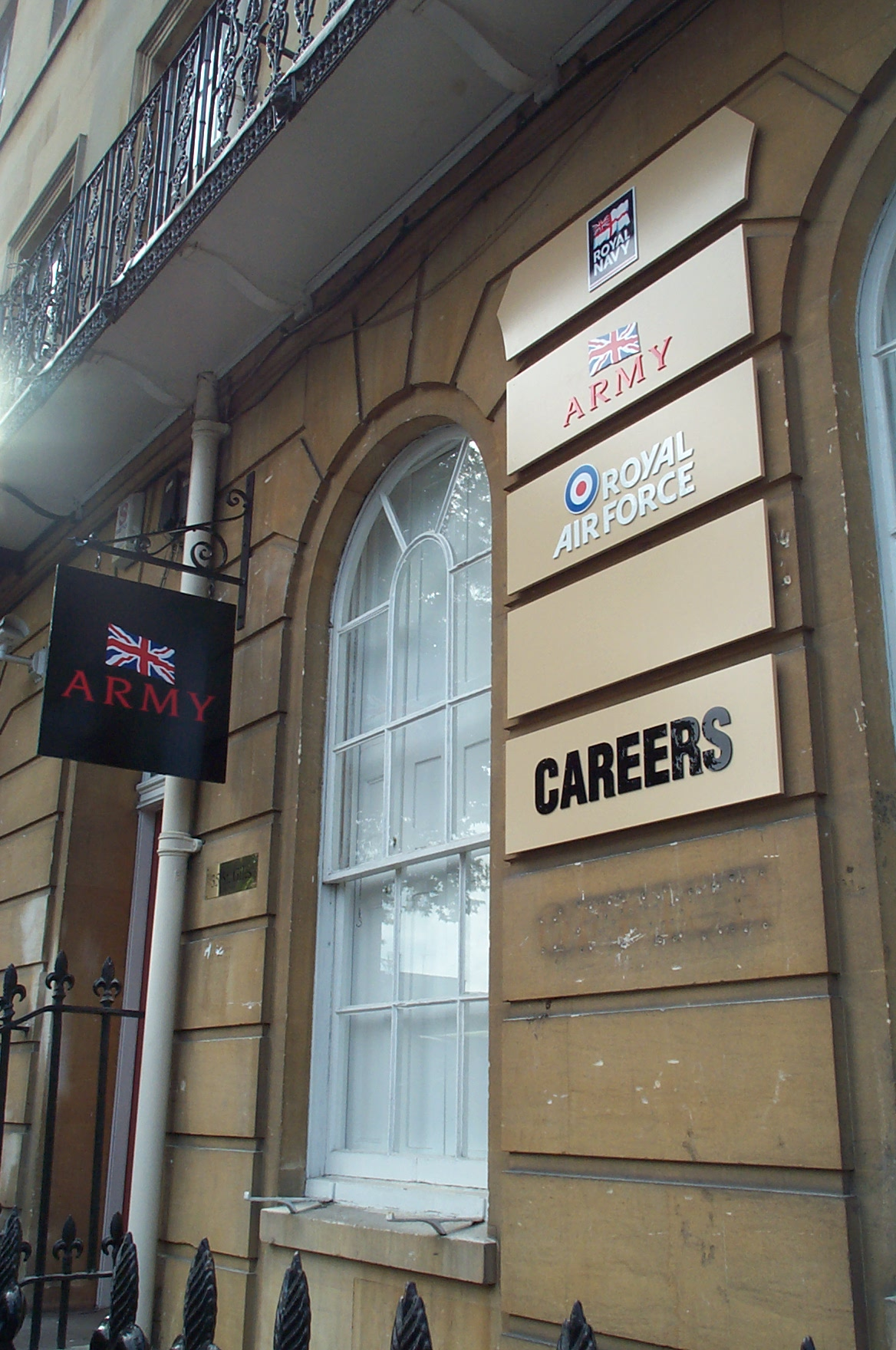
A British Army recruitment centre.

At the turn of the 21st century, the British army numbered about 102,000 regular personnel, with about 25,000 recruits per year, mainly from the United Kingdom. The Army missed its recruitment targets in the 2010s, despite raising the number of recruits from Commonwealth countries. The Army was shrunk to 82,000 in 2015, 82,000 in 2021, and about 72,000 thereafter.

The minimum recruitment age is 16 years, after the end of GCSEs, although soldiers may not serve on operations below 18 years. As of November 2018, the maximum age to enlist as a Regular soldier is 35 years and 6 months, and for Reserve soldiers, the maximum age is 49. For those entering as commissioned officers, the maximum age is 29. The normal term of engagement is 22 years; and, once enlisted, soldiers are not normally permitted to leave until they have served at least four years. Soldiers are now enlisted on a 24-year engagement known as versatile engagement (VEng). After 22 years service a soldier may be offered a 2-year extension. After the 2 years, the soldier or officer may be offered a further 2 years service and thereafter until they reach 55 years of age.

== Officers and royalty ==
Officers of the British army before the late 18th century were mainly recruited from a narrow segment of society, with a majority coming from the landed gentry and the aristocracy or often officers were from families with a military tradition. (This contrasted with the Navy, whose officers were more often from a middle-class background.) The second son of King George III, Prince Frederick, Duke of York and Albany, did much to improve the standard of officer recruitment from his position as Commander in Chief of the Army (from 1795 to 1809, then from 1811 to 1827). The sale of commissions, finally abolished in the Cardwell reforms in 1868–1874, and the further Childers Reforms. In spite of its abolition, the status of an officer being from a privileged background and that of another rank being from a less privileged one has, for the most part remained.

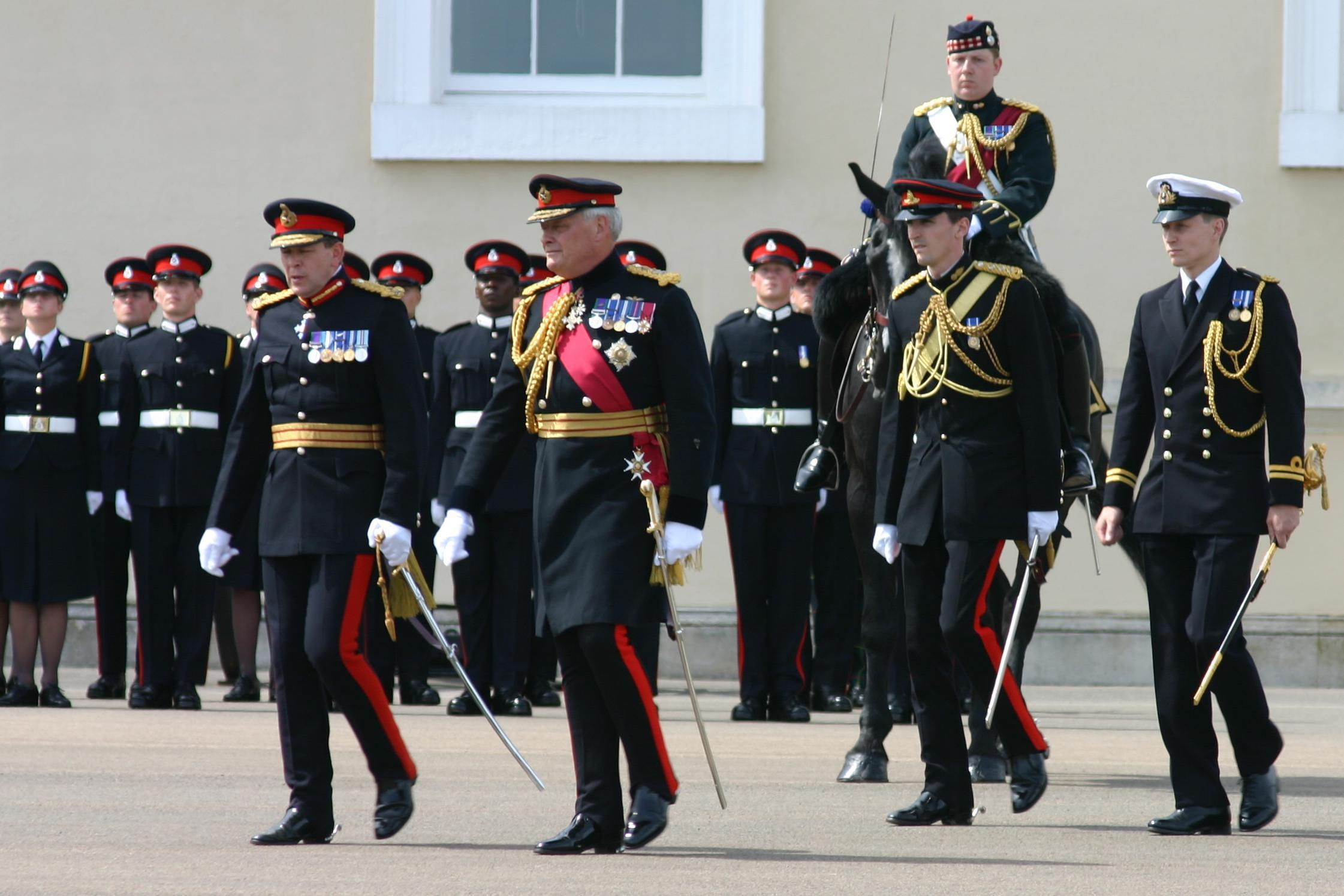
Army Parade with Prince Harry

The Royal Family traditionally had its members serve in the Armed Forces, usually with the Royal Navy though many have served with the Army. This occasionally warped operations in the field, for example at the Battle of Tel el-Kebir, where Wolseley was forced to leave an entire brigade of Guards in reserve to avoid harm coming to Queen Victoria's third son, the Duke of Connaught. The tradition has continued into the 21st century, with Prince Harry and Prince William both joining the Army as officers. However, Royals are no longer deliberately kept out of harm's way; Prince Harry saw active service in Afghanistan until the publicity posed a threat to the troops serving with him, while Prince Andrew served as a front-line helicopter pilot with the Royal Navy during the Falklands War.

Foreign Royals have also served in the Army, such as Eugène Bonaparte, the son of Napoléon III, who was commissioned into the Royal Artillery, but was killed in 1879 while serving in South Africa during the Anglo-Zulu War. Later in the 20th century, King Abdullah II of Jordan served as a Second Lieutenant with the 13th/18th Royal Hussars (Queen Mary's Own), and Sultan Qaboos bin Said al Said of Oman served with the Cameronians (Scottish Rifles).

== Recruitment from the Empire and Commonwealth ==
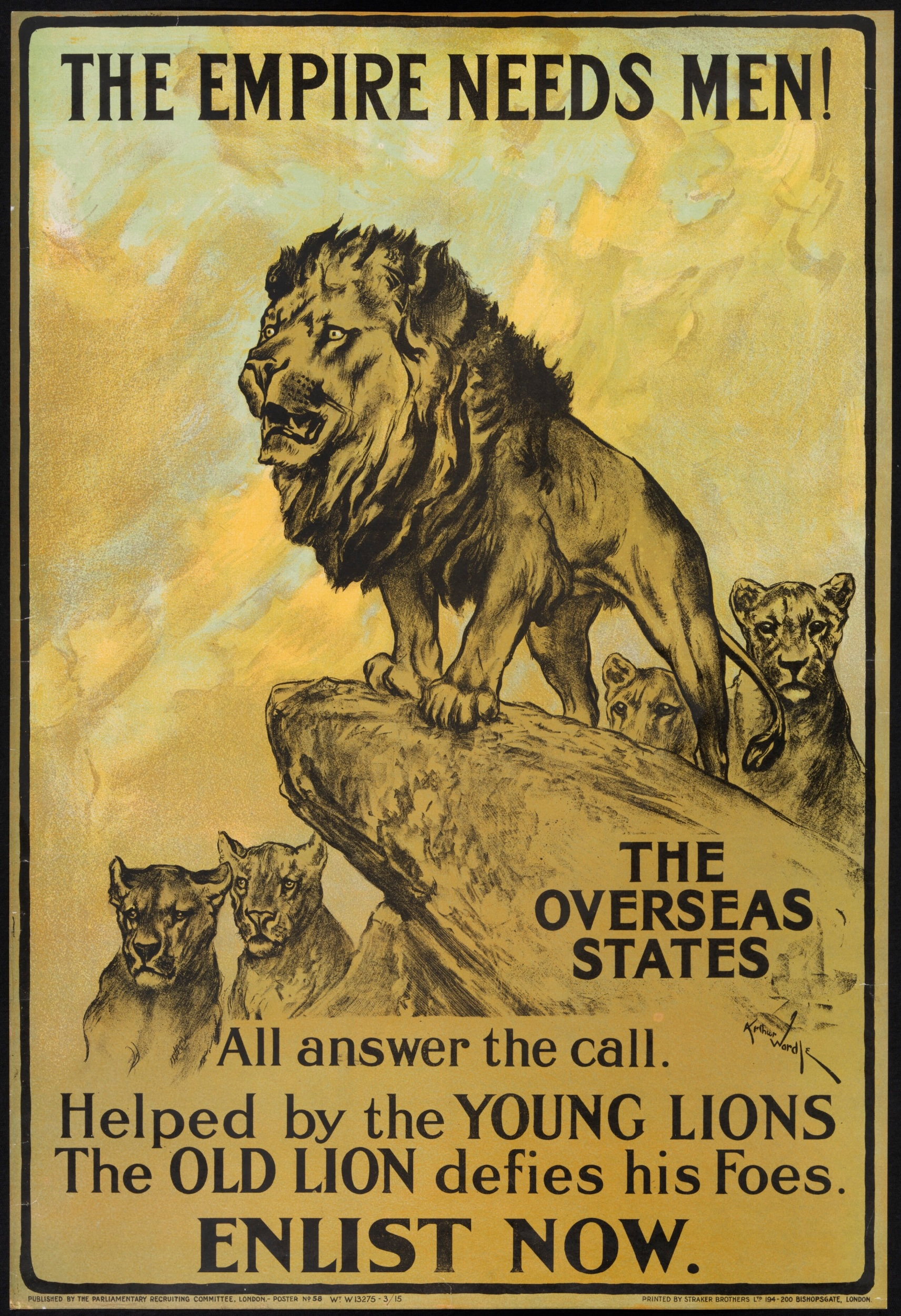
This First World War poster, urges men from the Dominions of the British Empire to enlist in the war effort.

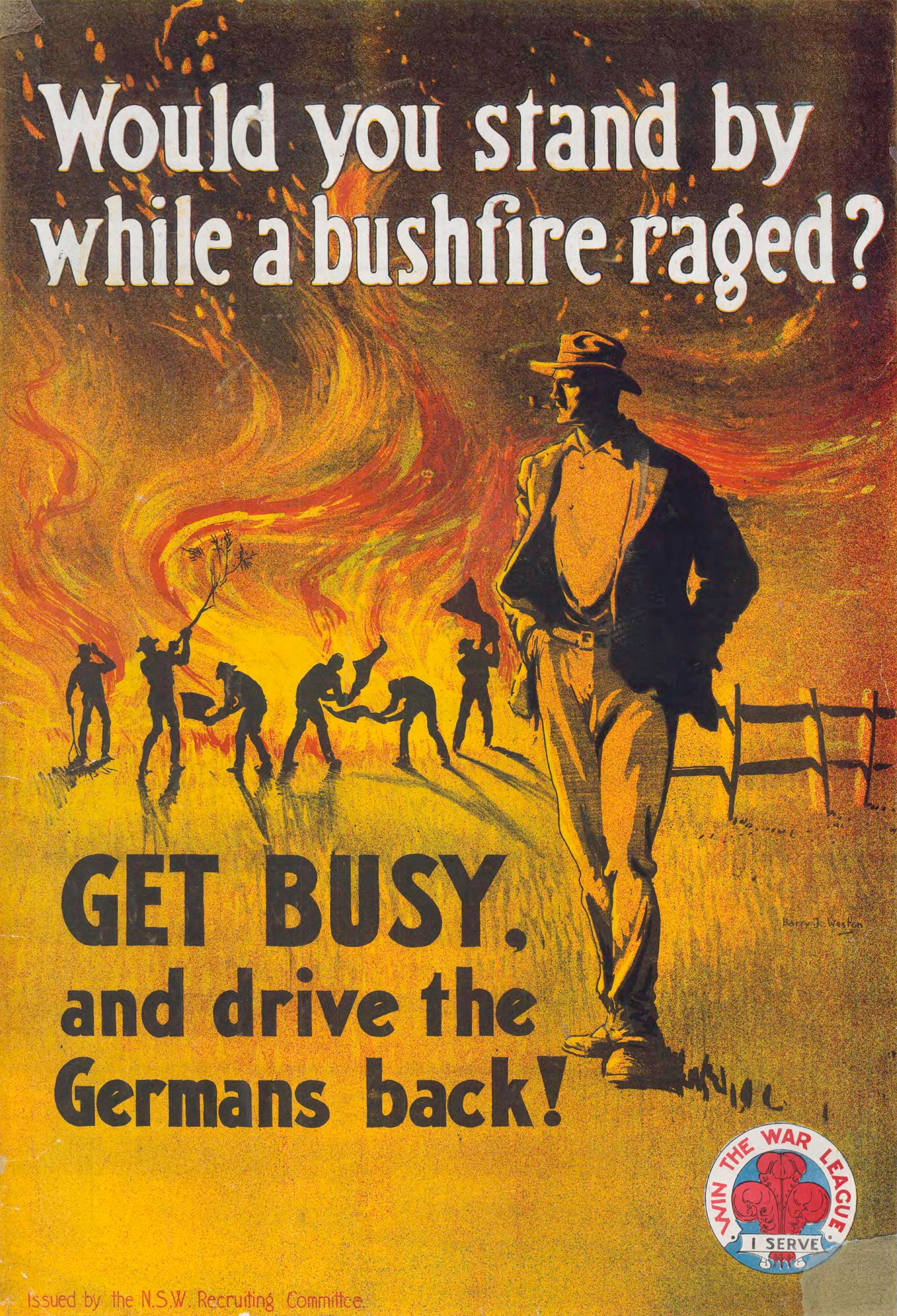
An Australian World War I recruitment poster

During both World Wars, subjects throughout the British Empire volunteered to help the United Kingdom. During World War I, the Dominions raised their own armies, but were under the British command structure, and very much integrated into the British fighting forces. Over 2.5 million men, which included Canada sending 418,000 men overseas, Australia sending 322,000, South Africa sending 230,000, New Zealand sending 124,000, and other volunteers from the Crown Colonies.

During peacetime, British Empire soldiers were usually recruited into indigenous regiments, such as the Hong Kong Volunteer Defence Corps, to garrison their own land, thus ensuring that the Army did not have to allocate its own units to garrison the territories. One of the oldest regiments raised from the empire was the West India Regiment, which was raised in 1795, and was formed as an integral part of the regular British Army. The recruits of the West India Regiment were originally raised from freed slaves from North America and by the purchase of slaves in the West Indies; the regiment was disbanded in 1927. The Fiji Infantry Regiment, which was raised in 1920 and consisted of a single battalion, garrisoned the Pacific territory. One of the largest units was the multi-battalion Royal West African Frontier Force, which garrisoned British West Africa and included The Nigeria Regiment.

=== British Indian Army ===
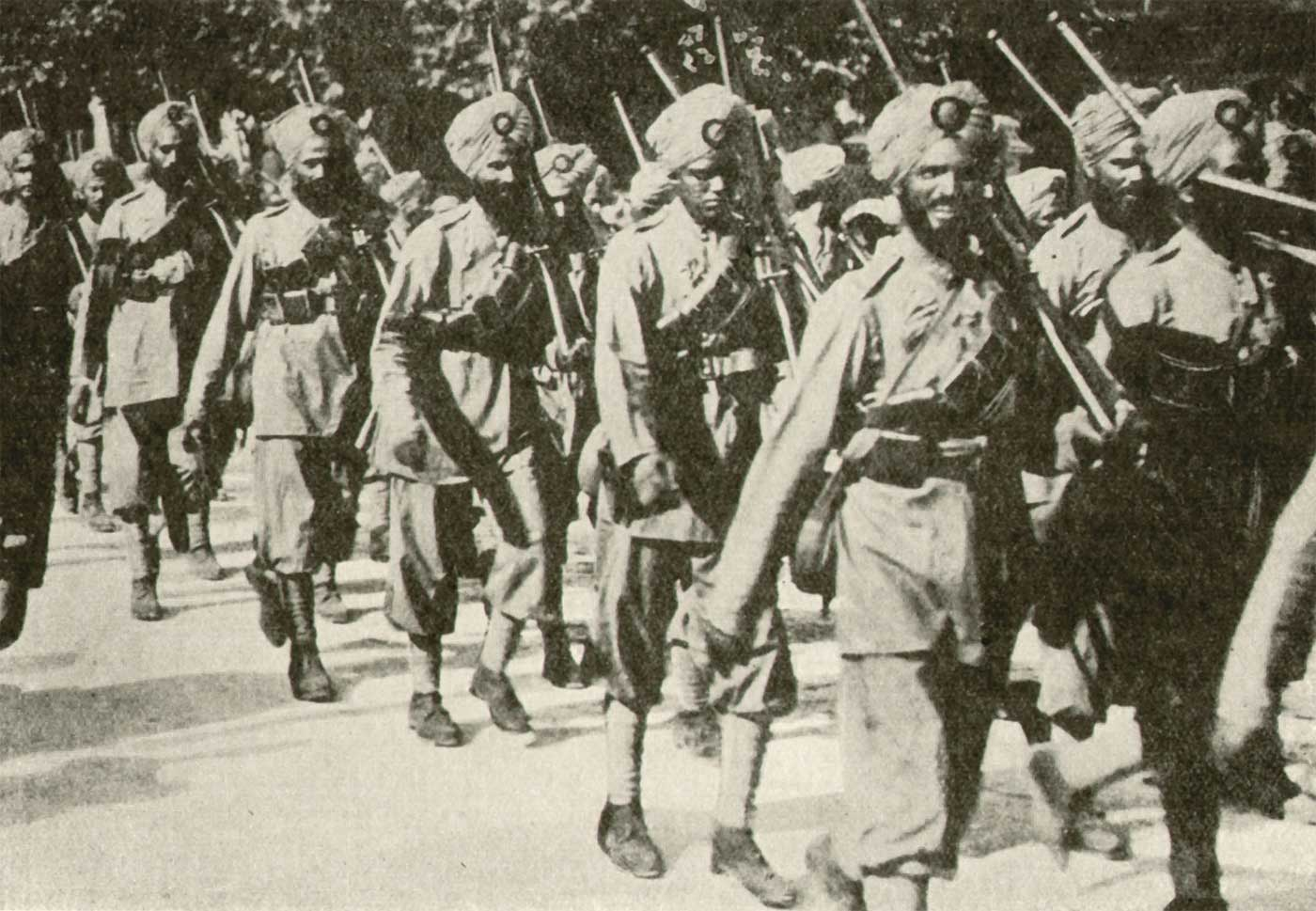
Indian troops on the western front

The largest of the colonial military forces was the British Indian Army. Up to Indian independence, this was a volunteer army, raised from the native population and staffed by British officers. The Indian Army served both as a security force in India itself and, particularly during the World Wars, in other theatres. The Indian Army proved a very useful adjunct to British forces wherever it served. Recruitment was entirely voluntary; about 1.3 million men served in the First World War, many on the Western Front, and 2.5 million in the Second. Initially the soldiers and NCOs were Indian, with British officers, but later Indian officers were promoted King's Commissioned Indian Officer.

=== Gurkhas ===
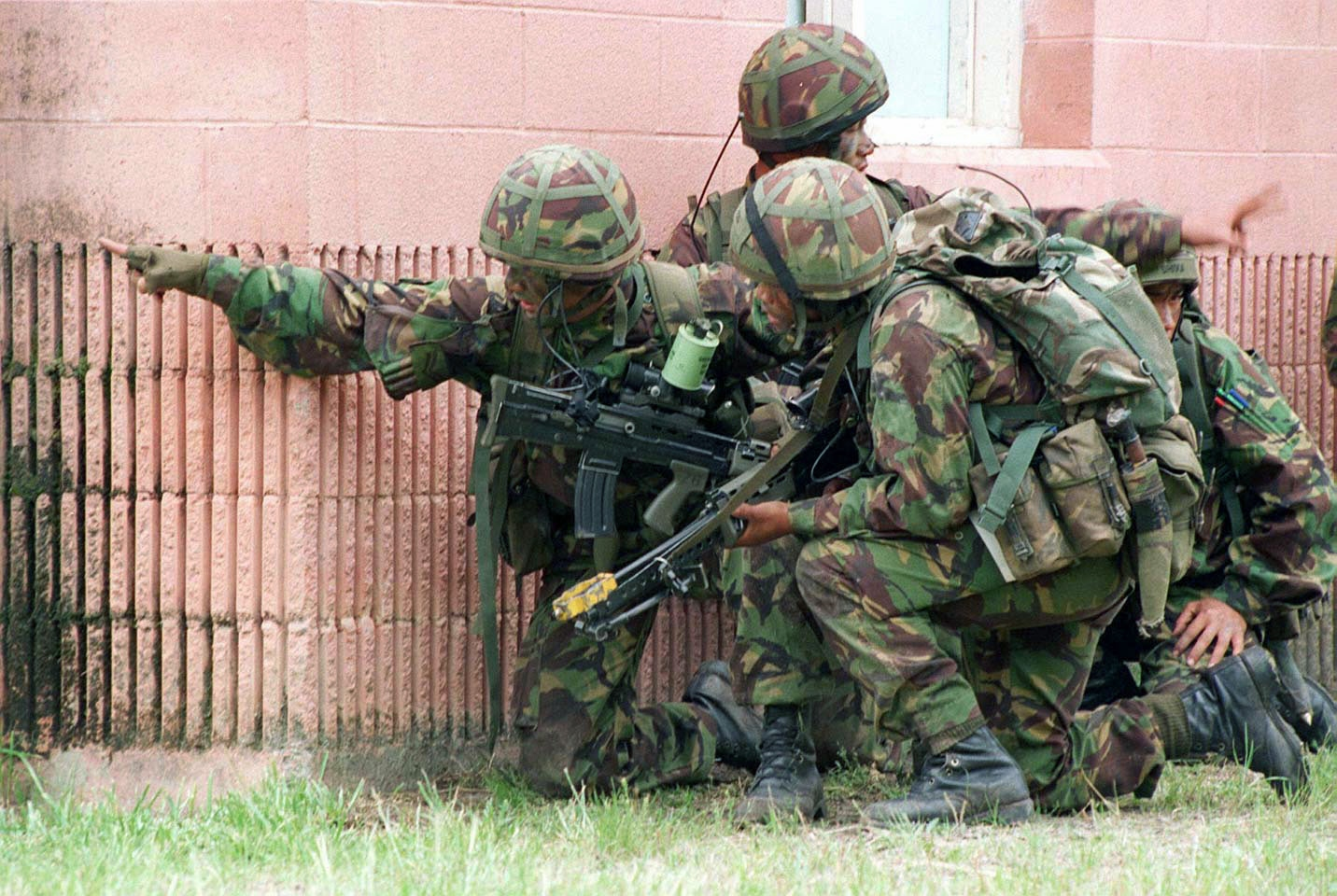
A British Gurkha unit

Gurkhas have been employed as an integral part of the Indian Army since the early 19th century. After Indian independence, some Gurkha units were transferred to the British Army. There are approximately 3,500 Gurkhas currently serving in the British Army. Joining the British Army is one of the few ways Nepalese people have of escaping poverty and earning a good salary. As a result, each year, there are thousands of applicants, as in 2007 when over 17,349 applied for just 230 posts. In some years, there are over 60,000 applying to join, and from 2010, women were allowed to join for the first time. Candidates must be between 17½ and 21 years of age.

=== Irish regiments ===
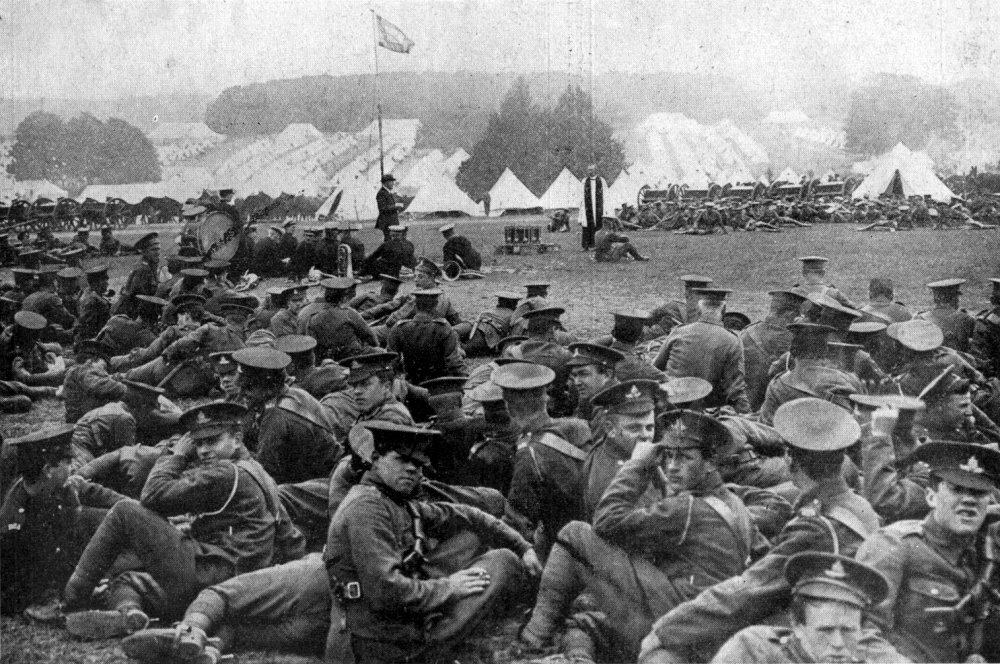
Irish Volunteers of the 10th (Irish) Division's Basingstoke, 1915

Irishmen have served in large numbers with the British army since the late 18th century, to the Napoleonic Wars and beyond. During this time, 20 to 40 percent of soldiers in the British army were Irish born. Levels would remain high, although recruitment steadily dropped from the period of the Irish Famine until 1900, but the Irish would remain over represented compared to the size of the population. At the turn of the 20th century, the number of Irish volunteers reduced, as the criticism by nationalists of recruitment to the army grew. Over 28,000 Irishmen served in the army during the Second Boer War, but by 1910 recruitment levels had fallen to 9 percent and for the first time were below Ireland's share of the UK population. During World War I, over 200,000 Irish soldiers volunteered to serve; many recruits from the new Southern state were known as National Volunteers. During World War II, over 70,000 were recruited from the Republic of Ireland and 38,000 from Northern Ireland.

The importance of the Irish in the British Army was summed up by Rudyard Kipling, who lost his son, Lt John Kipling of the Irish Guards, in World War I:

For where there are Irish there's bound to be fighting,
And when there's no fighting it's Ireland no more.

—

=== Present Commonwealth and foreign recruitment ===
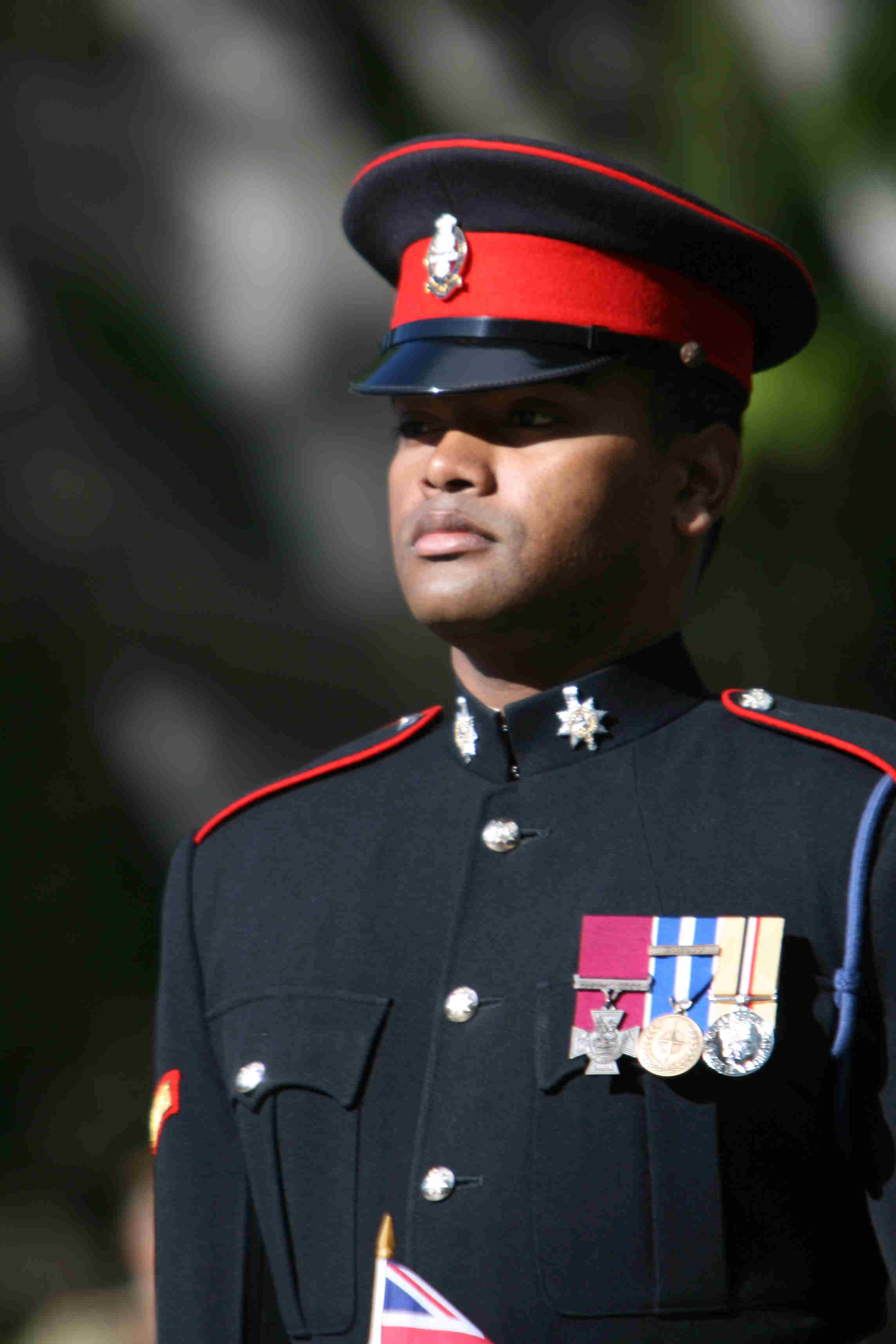
Johnson Beharry VC was born in Grenada

Until 1998 there were restrictions on the enlistment of Commonwealth citizens in the British Army. Commonwealth citizens could generally join if they had been resident in the United Kingdom for five years. In 1998 the restrictions were lifted, following recruiting difficulties among British citizens. Under the new provisions Commonwealth citizens were permitted to enlist directly in any one of the British services and significant numbers did so in subsequent years.

The Ministry of Defence later capped the number of recruits from Commonwealth countries at 10% of any corps or regiment in the Army, although this did not affect the Gurkhas. The cap was debated, as some feared the army's "Britishness" was being diluted, and employing too many could make the army seem as employing too many mercenaries.

In 2008, Commonwealth origin volunteers comprised approximately 6.7% of the Army's total strength. In total, 6,600 foreign soldiers from 42 countries were represented in the Army, not including Gurkhas, i.e. Nepalis. After Nepal, the nation with most citizens in the British Army was Fiji, with 1,900, followed by Jamaica and Ghana with 600 each; soldiers also came from more prosperous countries, such as Australia, New Zealand and South Africa. There are also volunteers from the Republic of Ireland – the level of recruitment among Irish nationals has been increasing, and figures for recruitment in Northern Ireland show that 16% came from south of the border during 2008.

However, in 2013 the previous restraints were reintroduced with immediate effect, in the context of reduced establishment numbers. From July 2013, all Commonwealth citizens except for those from Ireland, Cyprus, and Malta must have resided for 5 years in the UK before being allowed to join. As of May 2016, commonwealth citizens can enlist in the British army in limited roles without meeting the residence requirements. On 5 November 2018 the Ministry of Defence once again removed the requirement of residing in the country for five years. This now meant that any citizen of the Commonwealth could join the Royal Air Force and Royal Navy as of 6 November 2018. However, the British Army planned to open applications in early 2019.

== See also ==
- Social background of officers and other ranks in the British Army, 1750–1815

== Sources ==
- Chandler, David; Beckett, I.F.W. (2003). The Oxford History of the British Army. Oxford Paperbacks. ISBN 978-0-19-280311-5.
- Clayton, Tim (2014). Waterloo. Four Days that Changed Europe's Destiny. Abacus. ISBN 9780349123011.
- Cookson, J.E. (1997). The British Armed Nation, 1793-1815. Oxford University Press. ISBN 0-19-820658-5.
- Crang, Jeremy (2000). The British army and the People's War, 1939–1945. Manchester: Manchester University Press. ISBN 978-0-7190-4741-1.
- Farwell, Byron (1973). Queen Victoria's little wars. Wordsworth Editions. ISBN 1-84022-216-6.
- Lindsay, J. O (1957). The New Cambridge Modern History: Vol. 7: The Old Regime. Cambridge University. ISBN 978-0-521-04545-2.
- McElwee, William (1974). The Art of War: Waterloo to Mons. London: Purnell. ISBN 0-253-31075-X.
- Vane, Hon. W L (1914). The Durham Light Infantry. The United Red and White Rose. London: Gale & Polden. OCLC 7279713.
- Young, Peter; Lawford, J.P. (1970). History of the British Army. Littlehampton Book Services. ISBN 0-213-00050-4.
- Simes, Thomas (1776). The Military Guide for Young Officers. London: Humphprey's, Bell & Aitkin.
