= Social background of officers and other ranks in the British Army, 1750–1815 =

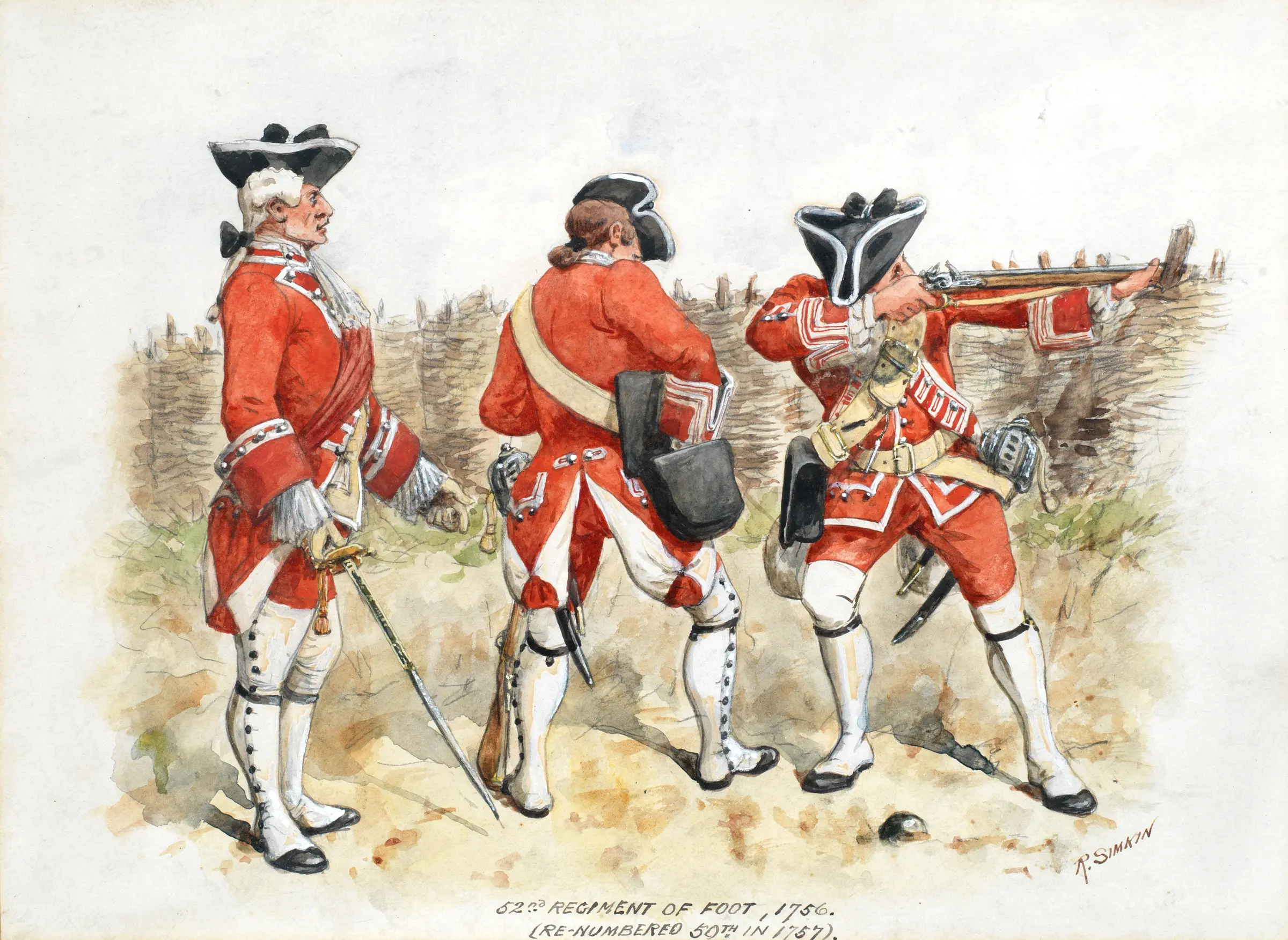
An officer and two privates of the 52nd Regiment of Foot in 1756. Most officers were members of the upper and middle classes, while virtually all privates were working class.

Social background of officers and other ranks in the British Army, 1750–1815 explains career paths and social stratification in the British Army from the mid-eighteenth century to the end of the Napoleonic Wars. The British army of the period was mainly recruited through volunteer enlistment. Most recruits were young men from the lowest social classes who could not find a livelihood on the civilian labour market. The non-commissioned officers were promoted soldiers sharing the social background of the rank and file. Literacy was a basic requirement for promotion to non-commissioned rank; writing and basic mathematical skills were compulsory for ranks above corporal. About ten percent of the commissioned officers were former sergeants, but the majority came from higher social strata. Aristocracy and gentry were over-represented in the higher ranks, but most officers came from a background of landowners, or were the sons of clergymen, lawyers, doctors or successful merchants. The purchase system was the mechanism through which the officer corps was structured according to social class.

== Organisational overview ==
The early modern British Army consisted of two distinct components that were kept separate in peacetime and at home. "The Army" in a limited sense, included infantry and cavalry, and was politically subordinate to the War Office, and under the military command of the Commander-in-Chief of the Forces at the Horse Guards. The "Ordnance" on the other hand, included the Royal Artillery and the Royal Engineers, and was subordinate to the Board of Ordnance at the Tower with the Master-General of the Ordnance as its senior political and military commander. The two components differed not only by uniform colors, but also by organisation, military ranks, promotion system, training, supply services, medical services, transportation, procurement, and budget. It was only in the field that a joint command was established.

Until the Union of Ireland with Britain in 1801, "the Army" was divided into a British and an Irish establishment. The British Establishment was funded by British taxes and had a budget fixed by the British Parliament; the Irish Establishment was funded by Irish taxes, with a budget set by the British government. The Irish Establishment was subordinate to the Viceroy of Ireland and his military staff. The viceroy also had his own ordnance master, and a separate Irish artillery, the Royal Irish Artillery, until 1801. The Irish Establishment was not a separate Irish army, although the units on the Irish Establishment usually were stationed in Ireland; regiments were freely moved between the establishments, and the regiments of foot were numbered consecutively through both establishments.

In the early nineteenth century, there were 13,140 officers in "the Army", 992 in the Royal Artillery, and 202 in the Royal Engineers. "The army" had 181,000 other ranks, while the Royal Artillery had 12,500.

== Rank and file ==
1780 caricature of three working class men being enlisted into the British Army

The British Army filled their ranks through voluntary enlistment. The enlistment period lasted for life (in practice, 25 years), ending only by death or through wounding. During war, the army offered shorter enlistment periods to entice more recruits. The army faced a constant lack of men wanting to enlist. As such, the army often forcefully recruited vagrants in wartime periods. During the Napoleonic wars, the militia was mobilized, but it could not serve outside England. As a result, the government tried to induce the militiamen to enlist in the regular army. Starting 1803, the government also drafted men into an Army of Reserve, the real purpose being to form a recruitment surplus for the regular army. This proved very unpopular politically, and the government abolished the system after three years. The government also recruited foreigners, to include the King's foreign subjects, other Germans, and even Swiss and Royalist French, into special foreign regiments.

Since 1701, the recruitment of both Catholic and Protestant Irish was prohibited by the Irish Establishment. Yet, this exclusion did not encompass the officer corps, and, at the end of the eighteenth century, Irish Protestants occupied a full third of the Irish regimental positions. The British Establishment formally prohibited recruiting Catholics, a ban that was abolished from practice in 1771. In 1775, the Irish Establishment began recruiting both Protestant and Catholic Irish. Apprentices, indentured servants, and coal miners could not enlist. Seamen were reserved for the need of the Royal Navy.

The hardship of military life, low pay, and the low social standing of the soldiery filled the ranks with men driven by impoverishment or drinking to enlist as a last resort. Contemporary social analysts placed the soldiery at the bottom of society, below common labourers but above paupers and vagrants. Most enlistees were young and almost always unmarried. Elder and married men had hope for some stability in life, but young rural day labourers found the labour market to be unsecure. Their best options for employment centered around seasonal farm hand labour, a full year if lucky. About a third of the soldiers worked as common labourers in civilian life, while almost a fifth worked as handweavers, a tenth cobblers, and a twentieth tailors.

Another analysis, this time of British soldiers stationed in North America during American Revolutionary War, found that a consistent link existed between recruitment and regional economic conditions in Britain. A higher proportion of recruits came from areas particularly vulnerable to economic cyclical fluctuations than areas with a stable economy. Most army recruits found themselves either permanently or temporarily outside the labour market because of the structural changes of the British economy that came with the Industrial Revolution. A fifth of the recruits either worked as textile workers or had had some other connection with the textile industry. Among recruits with a background as craftsmen, the trades affected negatively by industrialization, such as shoemakers, dominated. Trades with marked seasonal fluctuations in employment, including bricklayers and stone masons, also provided the army with many recruits. Socially and economically stable working class occupations (miners, ironworks workers, or nailors for example) supplied very few soldiers.

== Non-commissioned officers ==
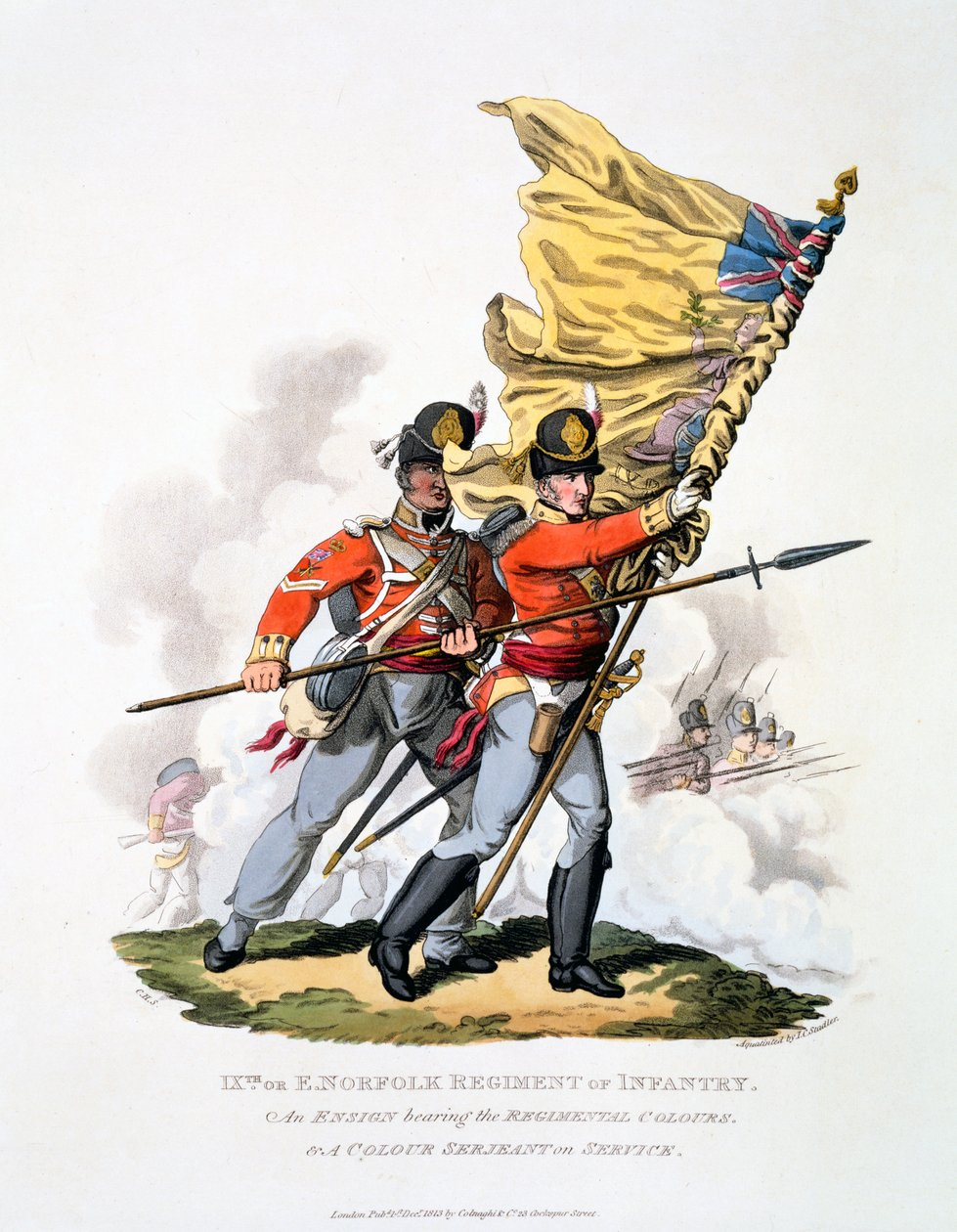
1813 engraving of a colour sergeant (left) and ensign (right) of the 9th Regiment of Foot

Non-commissioned officers in the infantry were sergeants and corporals. In addition to the direct leadership of the rank and file entrusted them, the commissioned officers happily surrendered the routine administration of the companies and regiments to the sergeants. Senior non-commissioned posts, such as colour sergeant, introduced in 1813, and sergeant major, were strictly speaking not ranks, but appointments. Appointment as sergeant major was the capstone of a successful career as non-commissioned officer, symbolised by an officer like uniform. Selection for this post was based on capability as a drill instructor, but to the same extent also of skills at writing and counting.

No special pattern for promotion to non-commissioned officer has been found. Literacy was a basic requirement and surprisingly many were promoted to sergeants after just one year of service. In the cavalry, the circumstances were somewhat different. Until 1810, when it was replaced by the rank of troop sergeant major, each troop of horse had a troop quartermaster, a rank between commissioned and non-commissioned officer. During the eighteenth century, this rank began to be increasingly seen as suitable for promoted sergeants. Nevertheless, the rank was attractive enough for poor young gentlemen who could not afford to purchase a proper officer's commission. Warrants as troop quartermaster could sometimes be purchased, although George II did not like to commission troop quartermasters.

The social ambitions of the non-commissioned corps were reflected in the fact that it was often senior non-commissioned officers who were the leaders in the Masonic lodges who took a prominent place in the social life of many regiments. Later in the nineteenth century, however, membership in military Masonic lodges was restricted to those who were Freemasons previous to enlistment.

== Rankers ==
About ten percent of the officers had first served in the ranks before being commissioned. This was a substantially larger proportion than during the rest of the nineteenth century, when the officer corps obtained the character of a closed caste. The background of the rankers can be summarised into three different categories.

1. Old and experienced sergeants, commissioned in order to get competent disciplinarians or administrators. Adjutants were often promoted from the ranks. At the end of the eighteenth century, quartermasters were exclusively recruited among the sergeants, with accompanying social stigma. Very skilled sergeants could also be commissioned, not rarely directly as lieutenants, skipping the rank of ensign. This category probably included the majority of the rankers. Most of them had many years of service behind them and it was very difficult for them to be promoted to higher ranks.
2. Another category was other ranks receiving battlefield commissions for exceptional bravery.
3. A third category was the volunteers; young gentlemen with the same background as the majority of the officer corps, but lacking the money or the connections necessary to purchase a commission. They enlisted as volunteers with the hope of being commissioned without purchase.

== Officers ==
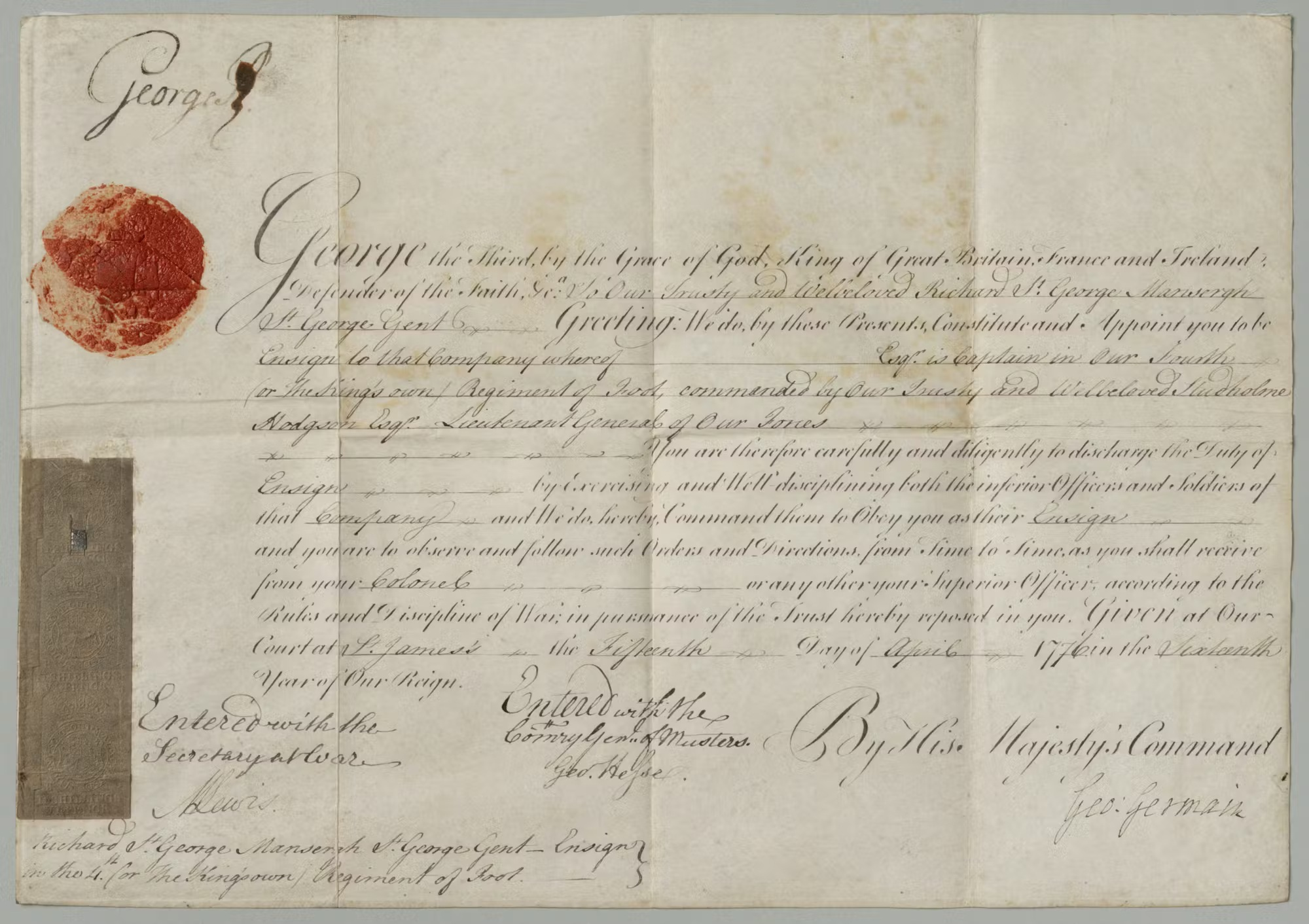
Richard St George's commission as an ensign in the 4th Regiment of Foot, issued on 15 April 1776

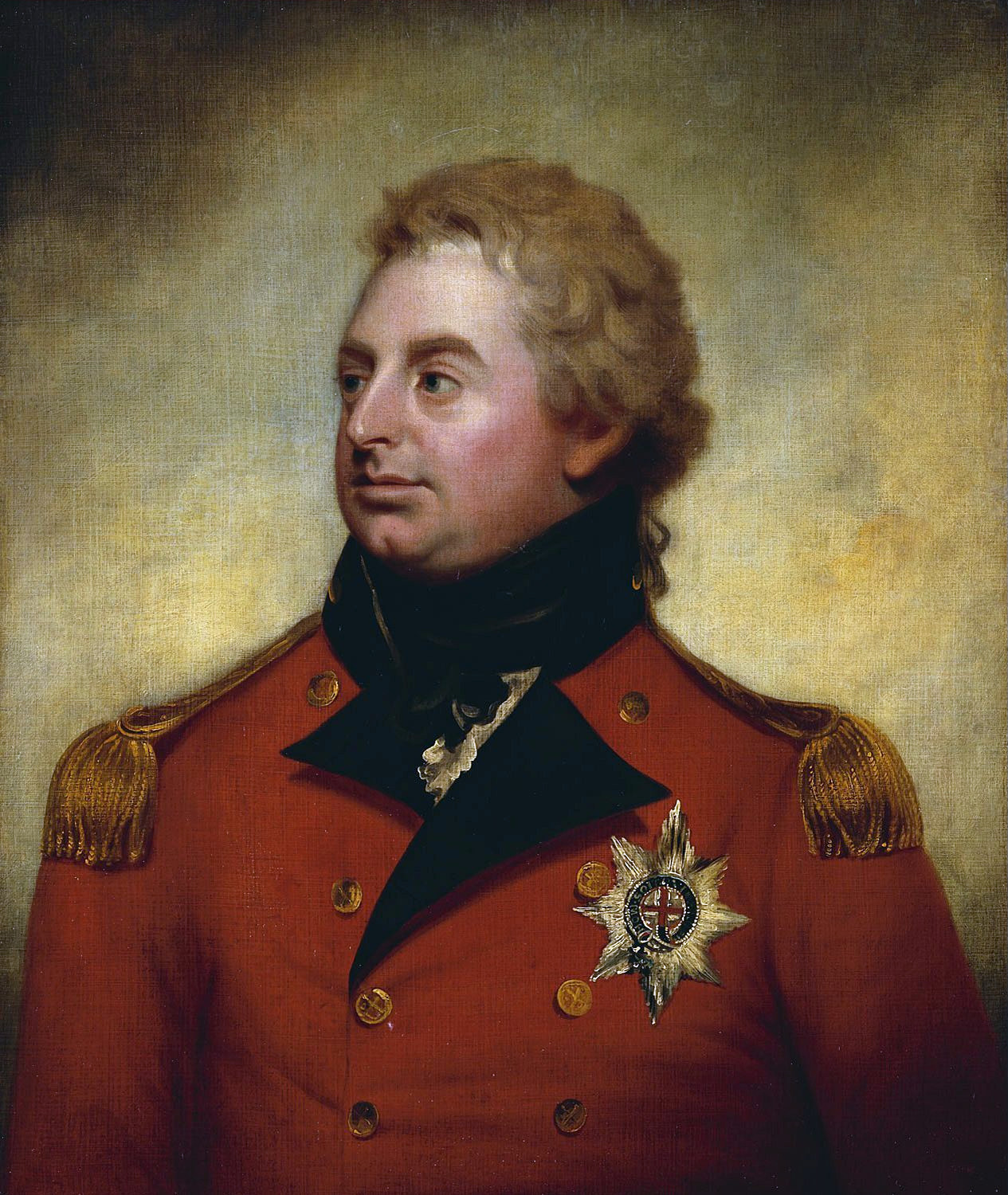
The Duke of York, George III's favourite son who became Commander-in-Chief of the Forces in 1795

The basic prerequisites for receiving a commission in "the Army" were very simple in theory. The prospective officer must have reached the age of 16 but not yet 21 years, be able to read and write, and show a letter of recommendation from an officer with the rank of major or above. Rankers were excepted from the age requirement. In real life, a commission required being of "good family", having access to money or patronage. No formal military training was mandated. Sandhurst was founded in 1801, but passing out from it was not a precondition for a commission. Two thirds of the officers in the infantry and the cavalry had purchased their commissions. One third of the commissions were non-purchase, issued as a reward for long service and good conduct in the next rank below, through patronage, or when a ranker was commissioned.

The purchase system was intimately linked to the political system, and the political leadership of the Whigs. It was seen as a guarantee that the officer corps would identify itself with social elite, and not act as an independent force in the interest of the King or itself. The system had been reinstated after the Restoration and was maintained until 1871 when it was abolished by the Cardwell reforms. During the eighteenth century the Crown attempted to regulate the system, and by the middle of the century the purchase of colonels' commissions was abolished, and promotion to colonel and above put strictly in the hands of the Crown. Less successful were different endeavours to regulate the costs of commissions, or to introduce a regulated promotion system. A young man with access to money and with the right connections could still become a lieutenant colonel within a few months after his first commission. Only when George III's favourite son, the Duke of York, became Commander-in-Chief of the Forces in 1795, a strict set of rules could be enforced. Two years as a subaltern was required before a captain's commission could be bought; the approval of the colonel of the regiment was also imperative. An officer had the right of promotion within his regiment according to seniority, and could not be bypassed unless he was unable to pay for the commission. If no one in the regiment could afford the commission, an officer from another regiment could buy it and be transferred to the regiment, something that favored men with money and contacts at the Horse Guards. If an officer was killed in action or died in the service, the commission was forfeited, and someone could be promoted without purchase. Casualties during a war therefore gave better chances for advancement for skilled officers without means. Such promotions were strictly based on seniority. Hence it was difficult, but not impossible, to advance solely through seniority.

Officers in the infantry and cavalry came from a fairly broad social spectrum, although socially dominated by the aristocracy and the gentry; albeit holding only about a quarter of all commissions in the eighteenth century, half of the colonels and generals belonged to these classes. Many sons of officers, including many Huguenots, also become officers; lacking the social status, economic security and connections enjoyed by the sons of the aristocracy and the gentry, their advancement was slower and needed the patronage of superiors from the social elite. Rankers rarely reached beyond subaltern ranks. The majority of the officers were competent professionals with long time in service, without private means, living on their pay. The lifestyle required of an officer with the King's commission meant, however, that the living costs often exceeded the income, with permanent money problems and indebtedness as a result.

Commissions in the Royal Artillery and the Royal Engineers required passing out from Woolwich. The time of study at the academy was not precisely established, but after 18–24 months of study the officer cadet took his final exam, and if he passed, and there was a vacant post, he would be commissioned in the most junior rank. Officers with the best grades at Woolwich became engineers, the rest gunners. The "Ordnance corps" did not have a purchase system, and promotion was by strict seniority. Advancement was therefore very slow, and as there were no pensions, or commissions to sell, gunners and engineers remained in the service for a very long time, even as superannuated and unfit for combat. This in its turn affected the prospects of the junior officers negatively.

== Nobility in the army ==
Military historians Robert Burnham and Ron McGuigan argue that "there is an enduring myth that the British Army of the Napoleonic Wars was an aristocratic army filled with the nobility who occupied the highest ranks". With there being 10,590 officers in the army in 1814, they determine that members of the British nobility made up 2% of the officer corps, or 224 people.The following table outlines the different members of the nobility serving in the British Army in the period of the Napoleonic Wars, 1805–1816:

Title	1805	1806	1807	1808	1809	1810	1811	1812	1813	1814	1815	1816
Prince	6	5	5	5	5	5	5	5	5	5	5	5
Duke	3	3	2	2	2	2	2	2	2	2	2	2
Marquess	5	6	5	3	4	4	3	4	6	5	3	4
Earl	17	16	21	21	20	22	22	24	27	28	26	25
Viscount	5	6	6	5	6	6	7	6	5	5	5	4
Baron	20	18	21	17	19	20	18	19	15	18	19	17
Courtesy lord	15	17	16	20	17	13	17	16	17	17	15	17
Honourable	127	113	144	138	146	147	143	151	138	144	131	131
Total	198	184	220	211	219	219	217	227	215	224	206	205

== Bibliography ==
- Bruce, Anthony (1980). The Purchase System in the British Army, 1660–1871. London: Royal Historical Society. ISBN 0901050571.
- Brumwell, Stephen (2002). Redcoats: The British Soldier and War in the Americas 1755–1763. Cambridge: Cambridge University Press. ISBN 0521675383.
- Burnham, Robert; McGuigan, Ron (2010). The British Army against Napoleon. Barnsley, South Yorkshire: Frontline Books. ISBN 978-1-84832-562-3.
- Clayton, Anthony (2007). The British Officer: Leading the Army from 1660 to the Present. London: Routledge. ISBN 9781138136335.
- Colquhoun, Patrick (1814). A Treatise on the Wealth. Power. and Resources of the British Empire. London: Joseph Mawman. OCLC 1114508669.
- Frey, Sylvia R. (1981). The British Soldier in America: A Social History of Military Life in the Revolutionary Period. Austin: University of Texas Press. ISBN 0292780400.
- Glover, Michael (1977). Wellington's Army in the Peninsula 1808–1814. New York: Hippocrene. OCLC 816124881.
- Guy, Alan J. (1985). Oeconomy and Discipline: Officership and Administration in the British Army 1714–1763. Manchester: Manchester University Press. ISBN 0719010993.
- Guy, Alan J.; et al. (The Oxford History of the British Army) (1994). David G. Chandler, Ian Becket (ed.). The Army of the Georges 1714–1783. Oxford University Press. ISBN 0198691785.
- Guy, Alan J.; et al. (A Military History of Ireland) (1996). Thomas Bartlett, Keith Jeffery (ed.). The Irish military establishment 1660–1776. Cambridge: Cambridge University Press. ISBN 0521629896.
- Holm, Richard (2002). Redcoat: The British Soldier in the Age of Horse and Musket. New York: Norton. ISBN 0393052117.
- Houlding, J.A. (1981). Fit for Service: The Training of the British Army. 1715–1795. Oxford: Clarendon Press. ISBN 0198226470.
- Oman, C.W.C. (1968). Wellington's Army 1809–1814. Greenhill Books. ISBN 0947898417.
- Reid, Stuart (1996). British Redcoat 1740–93. London: Osprey. ISBN 1855325543.
- Reid, Stuart (1997). British Redcoat (2) 1793–1815. London: Osprey. ISBN 185532556X.
- Ward, S.P.G. (1957). Wellington's Headquarters: A Study of the Administrative Problems in the Peninsula. London: Oxford University Press. OCLC 253537143.
