= Ronald Tinker =

New Zealand musterer and military leader

Ronald Arthur Tinker
- Born: 13 April 1913; Christchurch, New Zealand
- Died: 16 February 1982 (aged 68); Christchurch, New Zealand
- Military career
- Allegiance: New Zealand
- Branch: New Zealand Military Forces
- Service years: 1939–1945; 1947–1962
- Rank: Lieutenant Colonel
- Unit: Long Range Desert Group (1940–45)
- Commands: 1st Battalion, Fiji Infantry Regiment
- Conflicts: Second World War; North African Campaign; Tunisia Campaign; Dodecanese Campaign; Italian Campaign; Albanian resistance; Malayan Emergency
- Awards: Officer of the Order of the British Empire; Military Cross; Military Medal; Mentioned in Despatches

Ronald Arthur Tinker OBE, MC, MM (13 April 1913 – 16 February 1982) was a notable New Zealand musterer, military leader, scientific administrator and sales agent. He was born in Christchurch, North Canterbury in 1913.
