= Sefanaia Sukanaivalu =

Fijian soldier and posthumous recipient of the Victoria Cross

- Born: 1 January 1918; Yacata, Fiji
- Died: 23 June 1944 (aged 26); Mawaraka, Bougainville, Solomon Islands
- Burial place: Rabaul (Bita Paka) War Cemetery
- Military career
- Allegiance: Fiji
- Service years: 1942 - 1944
- Rank: Corporal
- Units: Fiji Infantry Regiment
- Conflicts: World War II: Pacific War; Bougainville campaign †
- Awards: Victoria Cross

Sefanaia Sukanaivalu VC (1 January 1918 – 23 June 1944) was a Fijian soldier and a posthumous recipient of the Victoria Cross, the highest and most prestigious award for gallantry in the face of the enemy that can be awarded to Commonwealth forces. He is the only Fijian to be awarded the VC.

== Biography ==
Sukanaivalu was born on Yacata, Fiji, on 1 January 1918 and joined the Fiji Infantry Regiment in 1942. By mid-1944, he was a corporal in the 3rd Battalion, which was taking part in the Bougainville campaign. He died under Japanese fire on 23 June 1944, at Mawaraka, during an attempt to rescue comrades, in circumstances which led to his being awarded the Victoria Cross.

The citation reads:

The KING has been graciously pleased to approve the posthumous award of the VICTORIA CROSS to:—

No. 4469 Corporal Sefanaia Sukanaivalu, Fiji Military Forces.

On 23rd June 1944, at Mawaraka, Bougainville, in the Solomon Islands, Corporal Sefanaia Sukanaivalu crawled forward to rescue some men who had been wounded when their platoon was ambushed and some of the leading elements had become casualties.

After two wounded men had been successfully recovered this N.C.O., who was in command of the rear section, volunteered to go on farther alone to try and rescue another one, in spite of machine gun and mortar fire, but on the way back he himself was seriously wounded in the groin and thighs and fell to the ground, unable to move any farther.

Several attempts were then made to rescue Corporal Sukanaivalu but without success owing to heavy fire being encountered on each occasion and further casualties caused.

This gallant N.C.O. then called to his men not to try to get to him as he was in a very exposed position, but they replied that they would never leave him to fall alive into the hands of the enemy.

Realising that his men would not withdraw as long as they could see that he was still alive and knowing that they were themselves all in danger of being killed or captured as long as they remained where they were, Corporal Sukanaivalu, well aware of the consequences, raised himself up in front of the Japanese machine gun and was riddled with bullets.

This brave Fiji soldier, after rescuing two wounded men with the greatest heroism and being gravely wounded himself, deliberately sacrificed his own life because he knew that it was the only way in which the remainder of his platoon could be induced to retire from a situation in which they must have been annihilated had they not withdrawn.

— The London Gazette, 2 November 1944

His body was eventually recovered by Australian forces assisted by members of the Fijian 1st Docks Company. Sukanaivalu was buried at Rabaul (Bita Paka) War Cemetery, New Britain, Papua New Guinea. In 2005, it was announced that there were plans to repatriate Sukanaivalu's remains to Fiji.
