= Fiji Infantry Regiment =

The Fiji Infantry Regiment
- Active: 1920–Present
- Country: Fiji
- Branch: Army
- Type: Line Infantry
- Role: Light infantry
- Size: Six battalions
- Part of: Republic of Fiji Military Forces
- Garrison/HQ: RHQ – Suva; 1st Battalion – Suva; 2nd Battalion – Sinai; 3rd Battalion – Suva; 4th Battalion – Nadi; 5th Battalion – Lautoka; 7th/8th Battalion – Vanua Levu
- March: Cori Mada Na Noqu Salusalu
- Engagements: World War II; Pacific War; Solomon Islands campaign; Guadalcanal campaign; Bougainville campaign; Cold War; Malayan Emergency; Lebanese Civil War; Battle of At Tiri; Persian Gulf War; Somali Civil War; Cambodia; Second Sudanese Civil War; Syrian Civil War; United Nations Interim Force in Lebanon; United Nations Iraq–Kuwait Observation Mission; United Nations Transitional Authority in Cambodia; United Nations Operation in Somalia II; United Nations Assistance Mission for Iraq; United Nations Mission in Sudan; United Nations Supervision Mission in Syria; 2021 Solomon Islands unrest

Commanders
- Colonel-in-Chief: President of Fiji

The Fiji Infantry Regiment is the main combat element of the Republic of Fiji Military Forces. It is a light infantry regiment consisting of six battalions, of which three are regular army and three are Territorial Force. The regiment was formed with the foundation of the Fijian armed forces in 1920. The regiment, as it is today, goes back to 1978 following Fiji's independence. The Royal Australian Infantry Corps and Royal New Zealand Infantry Regiment conduct yearly training seminars and exercises with the Fiji Infantry Regiment.

== Regular Force ==
- 1st Battalion, Fiji Infantry Regiment: The 1st Battalion was originally raised in response to the request by the US Forces deployed in the Pacific theatre during the Second World War for operations in the Solomon Islands. The Battalion left Fiji in 1943 and saw action in Guadalcanal, Kolombangara, Bougainville and other parts of the Solomons. The Battalion spent 17 months overseas before returning to Fiji in 1944. They were then redeployed overseas during the Malayan Emergency, and conducted operations in the theatre from January 1952 to July 1953 under the command of New Zealander, Lieutenant Colonel Ronald Tinker. The battalion was reformed in 1978, since which it has been permanently deployed on United Nations peacekeeping missions overseas. Until 2002, this was with the UNIFIL mission in Lebanon, following which it returned to Fiji. In December 2004, 1FIR took over as the guard unit to the UNAMI mission in Iraq. The battalion provides a company group of approximately 220 for this task. In addition, it provides troops for the Fijian contingent attached to the UNMIS mission in Sudan.
- 2nd Battalion, Fiji Infantry Regiment: The 2nd Battalion was formed in 1982 when it converted from a TF unit. It has been deployed with the Multinational Force and Observers mission on the Sinai Peninsula ever since.
- 3rd Battalion, Fiji Infantry Regiment: The 3rd Battalion was formed in 1982 as a TF unit to replace the 2nd Battalion following its deployment to Sinai. It became part of the regular force following the 1987 coups. It is the largest of the three regular battalions, and has two main responsibilities:
  - Providing fresh troops for deployment with the 1st and 2nd battalions.
  - Maintaining the territorial defence of Fiji, specifically for the main island of Viti Levu.

== Territorial Force ==
Each of the three battalions in the territorial force exists as a single regular infantry company, all of which come under the operational command of the 3rd Battalion. However, all of these can be augmented to full strength with the addition of TF volunteer companies as needed. All of these units were formed following the 1987 coups and the conversion of the 3rd Battalion to regulars:

- 4th Battalion, Fiji Infantry Regiment: The 4th Battalion has responsibility for the defence of Nadi airport and the surrounding area.
- 5th Battalion, Fiji Infantry Regiment: The 5th Battalion has responsibility for the defence of the area around Lautoka, Ba, Tavua, Vatukaula and Ra.
- 7th/8th Battalion, Fiji Infantry Regiment: The 7th/8th Battalion was formed by the amalgamation of the 7th and 8th Battalions, and is responsible for the defence of the Vanua Levu region.

== History ==
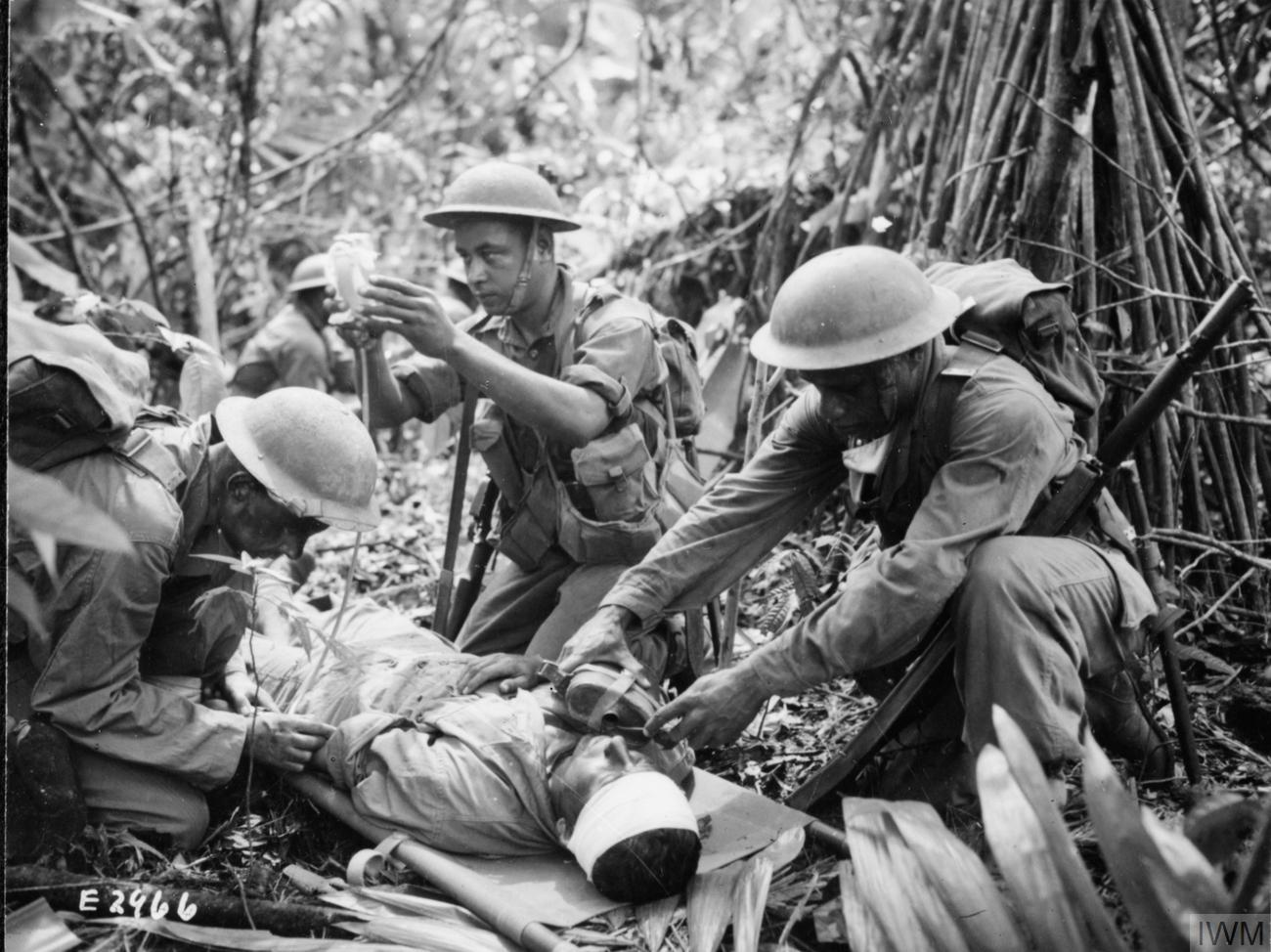
World War II. A Fijian medical orderly administers an emergency plasma transfusion during heavy fighting on Bougainville, c. 1944.

The Fiji Infantry Regiment in its current form traces its history back to the Second World War. Prior to this, Fijian infantry was formed as a Territorial battalion, with additional rifle companies, as part of the Fiji Defence Force. In May 1940, a regular rifle company was formed. The first three intakes of recruits were then formed into the 1st Battalion, Fiji Defence Force in October 1940. The 2nd Battalion, formed after the outbreak of war, became the territorial unit. The unit served in World War II initially under the command of Col. J. E. Workman of the New Zealand Defence Force (NZDF). The main purpose of this unit at the time was to protect vulnerable points such as fuel dumps and important government buildings in the Suva area.

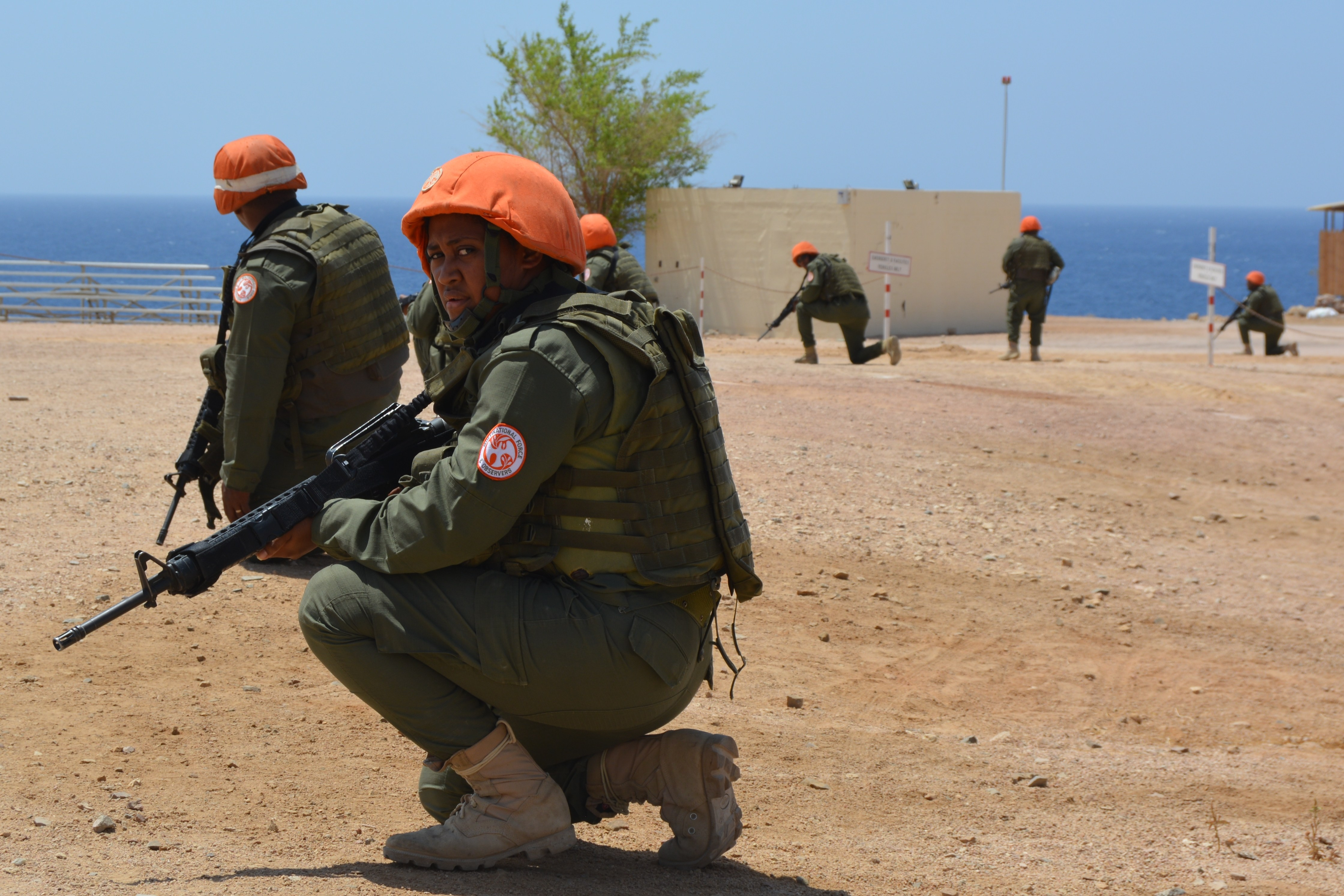
Fijian soldiers attached to MFO during a mass-casualty exercise with the US military

With the US entrance to the war, the US sought a forward training area and resupply base to serve as a potential line of defense against the Japanese sweep through the Pacific. Fiji geographically and logistically was the best location. In June 1942, the 37th Division in its entirety had established a base of operations throughout Fiji. With the arrival of US forces, it was decided to relieve the NZDF and place the Fiji Defense Force under US control. The shift of power was completed on June 30. The Fiji Defense Force saw extensive use throughout the war, and after the Solomon Islands Campaign the demobilization of Fiji Forces was announced on September 1, 1945. During the war, one member of the regiment, Sefanaia Sukanaivalu, received the Victoria Cross, the highest military decoration of the Commonwealth for his actions during the fighting on Bougainville.

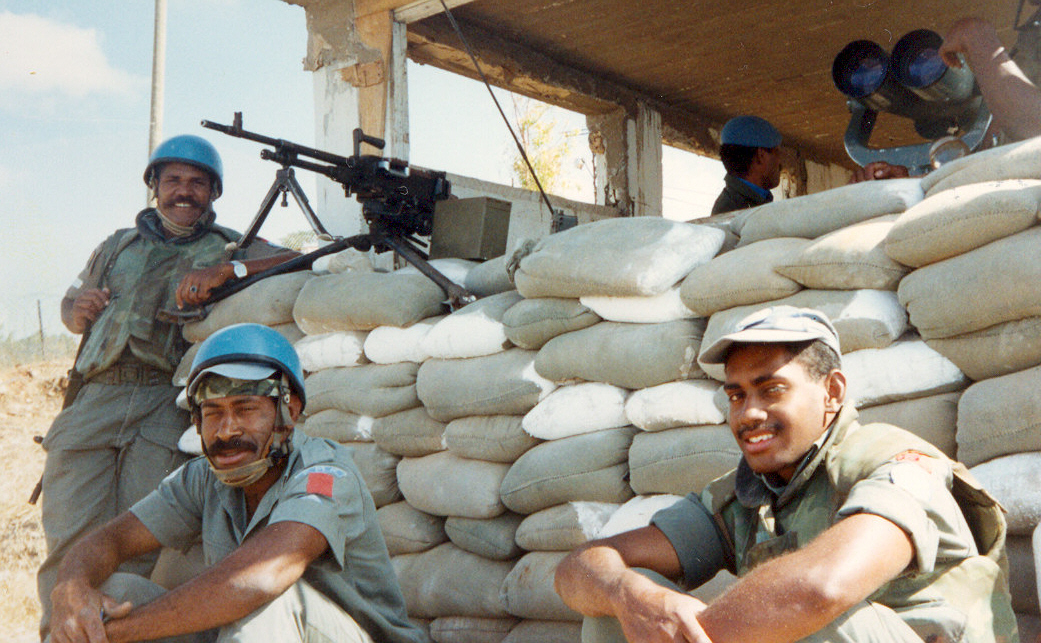
Fijian UNIFIL peacekeepers, part of UNIFIL's Force Mobile Reserve, in southern Lebanon, 1989

With the Fijian independence in later years, the 1st Battalion was reactivated, this time under the control of the independent government of Fiji. In 1978, with the UN resolution to establish the United Nations Interim Force in Lebanon (UNIFIL), the 1st Battalion was deployed at the inception of UNIFIL. In 1981, following the decision by the UN not to send a peacekeeping force to the Sinai Peninsula, the Multinational Force and Observers organisation was established to serve as an independent multinational peacekeeping force in the region. Fiji volunteered an infantry battalion to serve as part of this force, and so the 2nd Battalion was converted from a territorial unit to regulars. The 2nd Battalion has served in Sinai with the MFO ever since. The 3rd Battalion was established as a regular unit following the 1987 coups, to serve as Fiji's main territorial defence formation. The 3rd Battalion also serves as the operational command unit for the territorial battalions, and provides fresh troops for both the 1st and 2nd Battalions. On 27 August 2014, 45 UNDOF peacekeepers were captured by the Al-Nusra Front and were released on 11 September 2014. In March 2017, UNDOF peacekeepers deployed for the first time with Bushmaster Protected Mobility Vehicles.
