= Qana massacre =

1996 attack on civilians by the Israeli Defense Forces in Qana, Lebanon

Coordinates: 33.209°N 35.299°E

- UNIFIL peacekeepers remove the remains of artillery attack victims
- Location: UNIFIL compound, Qana, Lebanon
- Date: April 18, 1996; 30 years ago
- Attack type: 155 mm gun shelling
- Deaths: 106 Lebanese civilians
- Injuries: 116 Lebanese civilians and 4 Fijian UN peacekeepers
- Perpetrator: Israel Defense Forces

The Qana massacre took place on April 18, 1996, near Qana, a village in then Israeli-occupied Southern Lebanon, when the Israeli military fired artillery shells at a United Nations compound, which was sheltering around 800 Lebanese civilians, killing 106 and injuring around 116. Four Fijian United Nations Interim Force in Lebanon soldiers were also seriously injured.

The attack occurred amid heavy fighting between the Israel Defense Forces and Hezbollah during Operation Grapes of Wrath. According to Israel, it had launched the artillery barrage to cover an Israeli special forces unit after it had come under mortar fire launched from the vicinity of the compound and radioed a request for support. Israel's claims were refuted by a United Nations investigation which later found that the Israeli shelling was deliberate, based on video evidence showing an Israeli reconnaissance drone over the compound before the shelling. The Israeli government at first denied the existence of the drone, but then said, after being told of the video evidence, that the drone was on a different mission. Israel rejected the findings of the UN report concerning the incident.

The incident would attract attention in later years after Naftali Bennett, the commander of the Israeli commando unit which had called in the barrage, entered politics, eventually becoming Prime Minister of Israel.

== Background ==
In April 1996, a ceasefire that had ended the July 1993 fighting between Hezbollah and Israel broke down. During the five weeks of fighting between March 4 and April 10, seven Israeli soldiers, three Lebanese civilians and at least one Hezbollah fighter were killed. The tally of injured was sixteen Israeli soldiers, seven Lebanese civilians, and six Israeli civilians. On April 9, in response to the cease fire violations, Major-General Amiram Levin of the Israel Defense Forces (IDF) declared: "The residents in south Lebanon who are under the responsibility of Hezbollah will be hit harder, and the Hezbollah will be hit harder, and we will find the way to act correctly and quickly." On April 11, after initial strikes against Hezbollah positions, the Israeli government, through South Lebanon Army (SLA) radio stations, warned residents in forty-four towns and villages in southern Lebanon to evacuate within twenty-four hours.

Within forty-eight hours, Israel launched Operation Grapes of Wrath. On April 11, the IDF bombarded southern Lebanon and Beirut, first with artillery and later laser-guided missiles. On April 13, Israeli warships initiated a blockade against Beirut, Sidon and Tyre, Lebanon's main ports of entry. Meanwhile, Hezbollah continuously bombarded northern Israel with Katyusha rockets. The IDF continued to bomb Lebanon's infrastructure.

== Shelling of UN compound ==
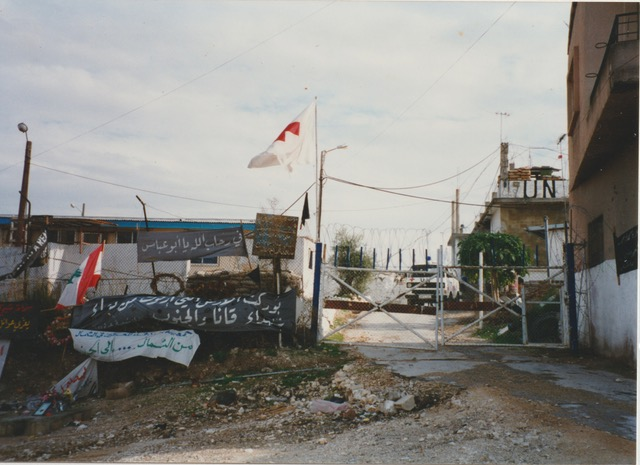
Entrance to the UN base in Qana, 1992

By April 14, 745 people took shelter in a United Nations compound at Qana, a UN battalion headquarters for 18 years, well-marked on Israeli maps, and bearing white and black UN signs. By April 16, Hezbollah had fired 120 Katyusha rockets into Israel, causing one casualty, at Kiryat Shmona, while Israel was firing over 3,000 shells, conducting 200 missile raids a day into Lebanon, and firing from gunboats on the refugee-crowded roads to Beirut. From 600 to 800 Beirut refugees were crowded in there on April 18. This tactic was widely discussed, and well known to the Hezbollah fighters and Lebanese citizens. Beginning with the second day of combat the IDF had been bombing within 10 minutes directly at any source of fire discovered by reconnaissance. According to a UN report, on April 18

Hezbollah fighters fired:

(a) Between 1200 and 1400 hours on 18 April, Hezbollah fighters fired two or three rockets from a location 350 metres south-east of the United Nations compound. The location was identified on the ground.

(b) Between 1230 and 1300 hours, they fired four or five rockets from a location 600 metres south-east of the compound. The location was identified on the ground.

(c) About 15 minutes before the shelling, they fired between five and eight rounds of 120 millimetre mortar from a location 220 metres south-west of the centre of the compound. The location was identified on the ground. According to witnesses, the mortar was installed there between 1100 and 1200 hours that day, but no action was taken by UNIFIL personnel to remove it. (On 15 April, a Fijian had been shot in the chest as he tried to prevent Hezbollah fighters from firing rockets.)

(d) The United Nations compound at Qana had taken in a large number of Lebanese seeking shelter from Israeli bombardments. By Sunday, 14 April, 745 persons were in the compound. On 18 April, the day of the shelling, their number is estimated to have been well over 800. When the Fijian soldiers heard the mortar being fired not far from their compound, they began immediately to move as many of the civilians as possible into shelters so that they would be protected from any Israeli retaliation.

(e) At some point (it is not completely clear whether before or after the shelling), two or three Hezbollah fighters entered the United Nations compound, where their families were.

During the operation, a special reconnaissance unit of 67 soldiers from the elite Maglan commando unit commanded by Naftali Bennett was sent into Hezbollah territory to hunt for rocket launchers and enemy fighters. On April 18, they had been operating in Lebanon for eight days when a sub-unit of the force came under Hezbollah mortar fire at 1:52 PM as it advanced near Qana from a Hezbollah mortar team positioned at a cemetery 170 meters from the compound, which fired a total of eight 120 mm mortar rounds at the force. According to eyewitnesses, the mortar team then ran to the compound and took refuge there. Bennett radioed for support, and minutes later, the IDF identified the source of the firing. As it was determined that no ground forces could reach the commandos to provide support, the decision was made to launch an artillery barrage instead.

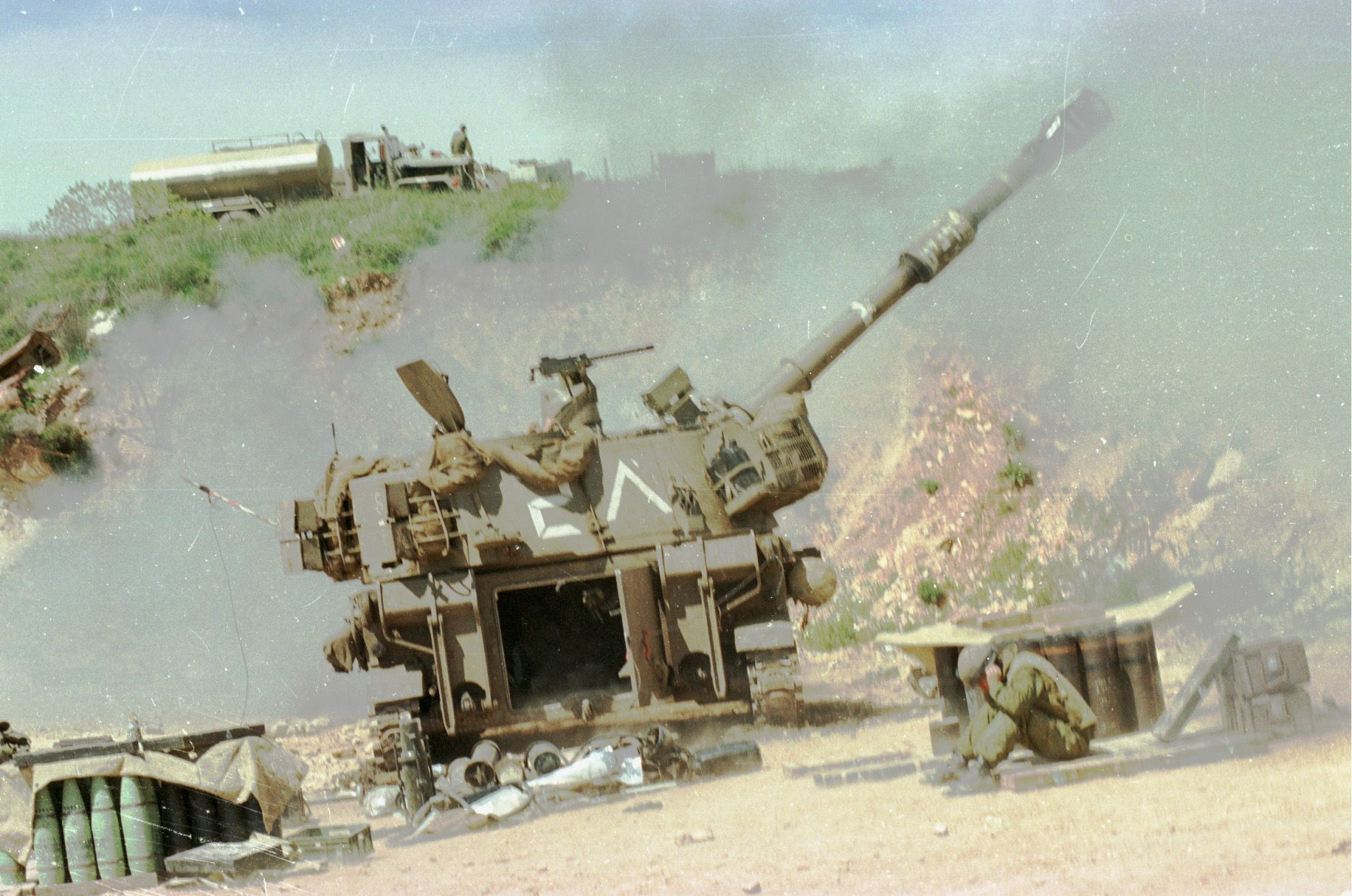
IDF 155 mm cannon bombarding the Lebanese soil, April 1996

An Israeli artillery battalion positioned just inside Lebanon was called in to provide fire support, and the call for fire was assigned to a single battery of four M-109A2 155 mm howitzers. From 2:07 PM to 2:12 PM, the battery fired 36 high explosive shells, consisting of 26 point-detonating fuze rounds and 10 variable time fuze rounds, all of which missed the area where the mortar had been fired from. The compound was hit by 13 shells, four point direct fuze rounds and nine variable time fuze rounds. The commandos were subsequently extracted by helicopter. As a result of the shelling, 106 civilians died, one Christian, the rest Shias, with more wounded. One man, Saadallah Balhas, lost 37 members of his family in the strike.

A video recording made by a UNIFIL soldier of Force Mobile Reserve (FMR) showed an unmanned drone and two helicopters in the vicinity at the time of the shelling. An Israeli government spokesman confirmed there was a drone in the area, but stated that it did not detect civilians in the compound. The IDF initially and repeatedly claimed, in response to the UN investigator, Dutch major-general Frank van Kappen's questioning, that no drone was flying in the area before or during the shelling. All eyewitnesses testified that during the attack a pilotless drone hovered over the camp. The truth only emerged when the UNIFIL soldier secretly delivered the tape to Beirut-based journalist Robert Fisk. Fisk sent the video to his newspaper, The Independent, which published stills of the footage in an article that appeared on May 6.

The Qana massacre resulted in a wave of international condemnation. As a result of the intense diplomatic pressure that followed, Israel ended Operation Grapes of Wrath before it had originally planned to.

== Israeli statements ==
The Israeli government immediately expressed regret for the loss of innocent lives, saying that the Hezbollah position and not the UN compound was the intended target of the shelling, and that the compound was hit "due to incorrect targeting based on erroneous data." Army Deputy Chief of Staff Matan Vilnai stated that the shells hit the base not because they were off target, but because Israeli gunners used outdated maps of the area. He also stated that the gunners miscalculated the firing range of the shells.

Prime Minister Shimon Peres said, "We did not know that several hundred people were concentrated in that camp. It came to us as a bitter surprise." Following the attack, Lieutenant-General Amnon Shahak, the IDF's chief of staff, at a press conference in Tel Aviv on April 18 defended the shelling: "I don't see any mistake in judgment… We fought Hezbollah there [in Qana], and when they fire on us, we will fire at them to defend ourselves… I don't know any other rules of the game, either for the army or for civilians…"

Both the United States and Israeli governments accused Hezbollah of "shielding", the use of civilians as a cover for military activities, which is a breach of the laws of war. The United States State Department spokesperson, Nicolas Burns, stated, "Hezbollah [is] using civilians as cover. That's a despicable thing to do, an evil thing." and Prime Minister Shimon Peres cited the use of human shielding to blame Hezbollah. On April 18 he said, "They used them as a shield, they used the UN as a shield—the UN admitted it." Rabbi Yehuda Amital, a member of Peres' cabinet, called the Qana killings a desecration of God's name.

== UN investigation ==
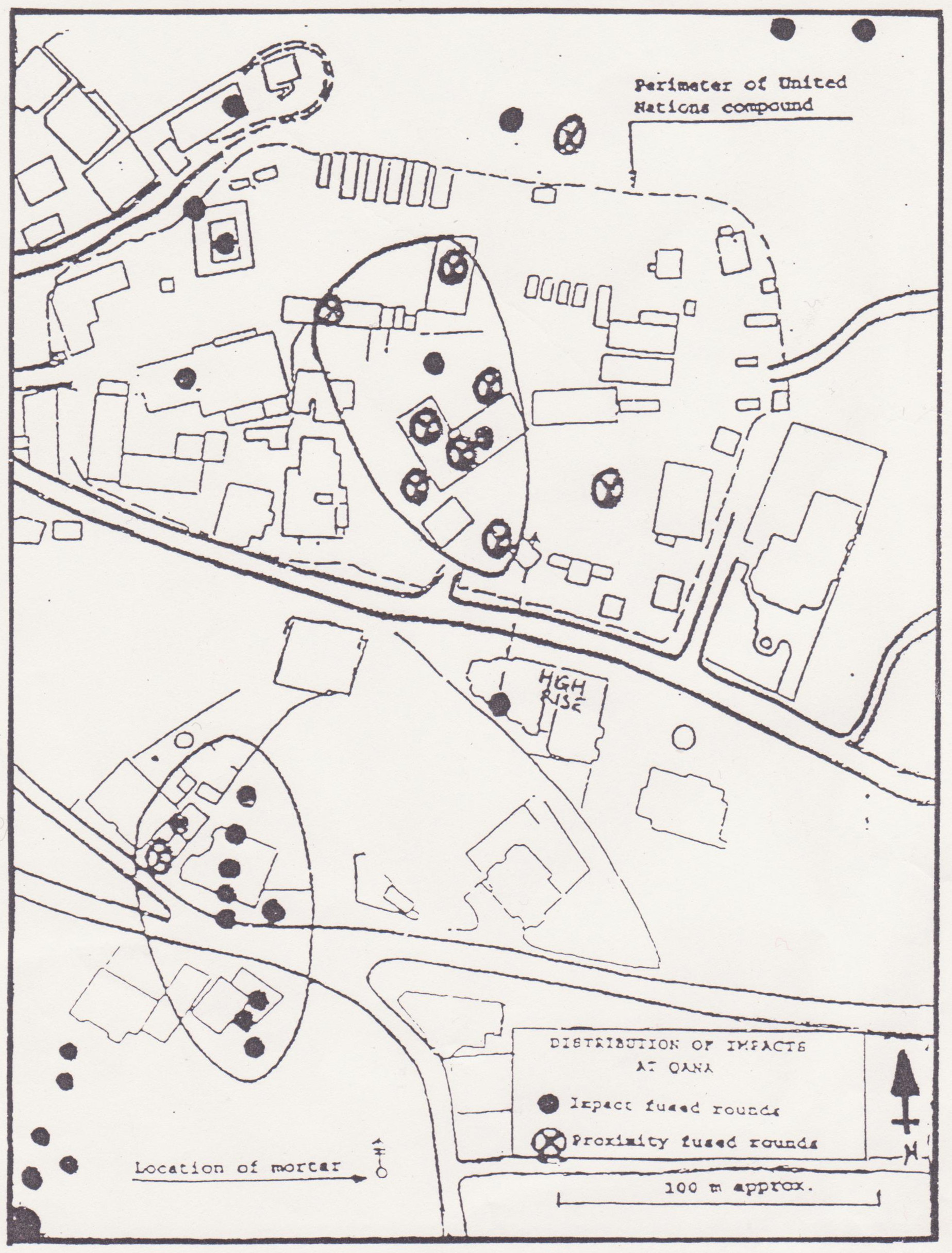
Diagram from Major-General van Kappen's report to the Secretary-General of UN Boutrous Boutros-Ghali, May 7, 1996, showing the cluster of proximity fused rounds within the UN compound at Qana

The UN appointed military advisor Major-General Franklin van Kappen of the Netherlands to investigate the incident. His conclusions were: (a) The distribution of impacts at Qana shows two distinct concentrations, whose mean points of impact are about 140 metres apart. If the guns were converged, as stated by the Israeli forces, there should have been only one main point of impact. (b) The pattern of impacts is inconsistent with a normal overshooting of the declared target (the mortar site) by a few rounds, as suggested by the Israeli forces. (c) During the shelling, there was a perceptible shift in the weight of fire from the mortar site to the United Nations compound. (d) The distribution of point impact detonations and air bursts makes it improbable that impact fuses and proximity fuses were employed in random order, as stated by the Israeli forces. (e) There were no impacts in the second target area which the Israeli forces claim to have shelled. (f) Contrary to repeated denials, two Israeli helicopters and a remotely piloted vehicle were present in the Qana area at the time of the shelling. While the possibility cannot be ruled out completely, it is unlikely that the shelling of the United Nations compound was the result of gross technical and/or procedural errors.

== Israel's response to the report ==
Israel issued the following response to the UN report:

1. Israel categorically rejects the findings of the UN report concerning the incident at Kana;

2. Israel profoundly regrets the loss of human life at Kana and has thoroughly investigated this tragic incident which was caused, first and foremost, by the firing of Katyusha rockets and mortars by Hizbullah from a location in close proximity to the UN position; We reiterate that the IDF had no intention whatsoever of firing on the UN position at Kana. Our investigation has shown that the UN position was hit by artillery fire due to incorrect targeting based on erroneous data. The IAF drone shown on videotape did not reach the area until after the UN position was hit and was not an operational component in the targeting of Israeli artillery fire in the area;

3. It is difficult to understand and highly regrettable that this report does not condemn Hizbullah for the cynical use of civilians as a shield for its gunmen, nor does it continue any condemnation of Hizbullah's use of areas contiguous or in close proximity to UN positions for launching attacks upon Israel;

4. This inaccurate and one sided report is misleading, runs contrary to the stated desire of the UN to play a more active role in the Middle East peace process and undermines its ability to do so. Israel hopes that the understanding reached between the various sides will engender the calm and stability necessary to engage the parties concerned in peace negotiations which are the only way to promote peace and security between Israel and Lebanon.

== Amnesty International report ==
Amnesty International conducted an on-site investigation of the incident in collaboration with military experts, using interviews with UNIFIL staff and civilians in the compound, and posing questions to the IDF, who did not reply. Amnesty concluded, "the IDF intentionally attacked the UN compound, although the motives for doing so remain unclear. The IDF have failed to substantiate their claim that the attack was a mistake. Even if they were to do so they would still bear responsibility for killing so many civilians by taking the risk to launch an attack so close to the UN compound."

Amnesty International could not establish with certainty whether or not the IDF knew that Lebanese civilians were sheltering in the compound when it was attacked. However, it wrote: "even if the IDF did not have specific information regarding civilians sheltering there, the general information it did possess concerning civilians in UN compounds – in addition to Israel's recognition that UN positions as such are not legitimate targets – should have been sufficient to prevent such an attack. The fact that the attack proceeded can only indicate a callous disregard for the protection of civilian lives and therefore a clear breach of the laws of war's prohibitions on directly or indiscriminately targeting civilians."

Amnesty International said it was also clear that Hezbollah fired a mortar from a position within 200 metres of the periphery of the UN compound and that they were firing at an IDF patrol who had infiltrated north of the security zone and had apparently been laying mines. Amnesty argued that while "[t]he intention of the Hizbullah combatants in choosing that location for the mortar is unclear", "by taking up positions where they did they [Hizbullah] clearly were reckless as to the consequences this might have for the civilians in the immediate area. In either case, this is a clear breach of the laws of war's prohibitions on using the civilian population as a shield." Nonetheless, the Amnesty International investigation concluded, "Hizbullah’s action in no way justifies the IDF attack on the compound."

== View of Human Rights Watch ==
Human Rights Watch concurred, "The decision of those who planned the attack to choose a mix of high-explosive artillery shells that included deadly anti-personnel shells designed to maximize injuries on the ground—and the sustained firing of such shells, without warning, in close proximity to a large concentration of civilians — violated a key principle of international humanitarian law."

== UN General Assembly vote ==
On 12 May 1997 Arab members of the United Nations financial committee lodged a claim against Israel for the cost of the damage the shelling caused to the UN base in Qana. It was calculated $893,319 was spent on reconstructing the base and treating the UN casualties. An additional $880,000 was spent relocating the battalion. This figure didn’t not include any calculation of the cost of the casualties and deaths of civilians.

The following month, by a 66 to 2 vote (59 abstentions, United States and Israel voting against), the United Nations General Assembly decided that the $1.7 million cost of repairs to the UNIFIL headquarters should be paid for by Israel.

Votes to reaffirm the resolution that Israel should pay the costs of damage appeared before the General Assembly every year until 2003 with the same pattern—one third for, one third abstaining, two (United States and Israel) against. The United States claims that financial resolutions, such as this, had to be adopted by consensus to apply, and Israel rejected any responsibility for it, claiming that "any damage caused to the United Nations Interim Force in Lebanon (UNIFIL)", is "the direct consequence of terrorist aggression and Lebanese collusion."

== Israeli Kol Ha'ir report ==
In May 1996 the Israeli weekly newspaper Kol Ha'ir published the personal accounts of several members of the Israeli artillery battery responsible for the shelling of the Qana camp. The soldiers spoke under condition of anonymity. One acknowledged that they were encouraged by their commander after the attack: "He told us it was war. Come on, the bastards fire at you, what can you do? He told us we were firing well and we should keep it up, and that Arabs, you know there are millions of them," Soldier A was quoted as saying. Another artilleryman, Soldier T, was quoted as saying that "no-one spoke about it as if it was a mistake. We did our job and we are at peace with that. Even 'S' told us we were great and that they were just a bunch of Arabs (in Hebrew, 'arabushim')...How many Arabs are there and how many Jews? A few 'arabushim' die, there is no harm in that." Similar sentiments were expressed by another soldier, Soldier Y, who remarked, "it's a war, in a war these things happen...It's just a bunch of Arabs. Why are you taking it so hard?" An official army spokesman's statement questioned the accuracy of Kol Ha'ir report.

== Lawsuit by relatives ==
On December 15, 2005, relatives of the victims filed suit in a Washington, DC court against former IDF Chief of Staff Moshe Yaalon for his role in the deaths. The lawsuit was prepared by the Center for Constitutional Rights. Yaalon, who was a visiting scholar in Washington, reportedly refused the papers serving the lawsuit. Among the plaintiffs named in the lawsuit are Saadallah Ali Belhas and his son Ali Saadallah Belhas who lost 31 family members in the shelling including their respective wives and 12 children. The United States District Court dismissed the complaint in 2006 on the basis that Yaalon was entitled to immunity under the Foreign Sovereign Immunities Act. The United States Court of Appeal for the District of Columbia affirmed the dismissal for lack of subject matter jurisdiction in 2008.

== 2015 Israeli elections ==
Criticism of Bennett's actions emerged during the lead up to the March 2015 Israeli elections, during which Bennett was leading one of the parties. Journalist Yigal Sarna claimed that Bennett had changed operational plans without consulting his superiors, whom he viewed as cowardly, and proceeded to lead his troops into an ambush. Sarna referred to the incident as ostensible evidence that Bennett showed poor judgement. Israeli journalist Raviv Drucker citing an anonymous "senior army figure" reported that Bennett's radio call for support was "hysterical" and contributed to the outcome that ensued. Bennett's deputy during the operation dismissed Drucker's charges as “Vanity of vanities, nonsense, a pile of bullshit". Bennett's position was also defended by other officers involved in the incident, including David Zonshine, later chairman of the human rights NGO B'Tselem, who called the reports "disconnected from reality," and by Haaretz's defense analyst Amos Harel, who noted that "Even if we assume for a moment that he was indeed hysterical on the radio, because his soldiers were in danger — Bennett wouldn’t be the first or last company commander in IDF history to have that happen to him."

Retired General Amiram Levin, who headed the IDF Northern Command at the time, also defended Bennett's actions, stating that he "commanded a force that operated deep in enemy territory and performed admirably" and that the IDF was forced to initiate rescue fire after the force was exposed and mortar fire began falling close to the troops. According to Levin, Bennett "demonstrated level-headedness and did not panic."

== See also ==
- List of extrajudicial killings and political violence in Lebanon
- List of massacres in Lebanon
