= Force Mobile Reserve =

Former task force of UNIFIL

Force Mobile Reserve (FMR) was a multi-national, mechanized, high-readiness military reserve force, established in 1987, and able to react to incidents anywhere in the United Nations Interim Force in the Lebanon (UNIFIL) area of operations.

== Background ==
In 1986, the armed wing of the Shiite Amal movement clashed gravely with French UNIFIL forces. It became apparent that UNIFIL could no longer continue peacekeeping along the same path. Hence, the decision was taken to redeploy about half the French battalion to UNIFIL headquarters at Naqoura to operate as the Force's mobile reserve.

On June 1, 1987, Force Mobile Reserve was established, composed of soldiers from each of the contributing contingents of UNIFIL. The deployment came with a mission to demonstrate an international willingness to resist attempts by forceful means to prevent UNIFIL from discharging its duties. FMR was via UNIFIL Force Commander placed under direct orders from the Secretary-General.

== Operations ==
FMR reinforced UNIFIL's battalions when serious incidents occurred and during rotations. In February 1988 FMR was equipped with Sisu Pasi XA-180 APCs set with 12.7 / 50 .cal HMG. The FMR was rigidly trained in public order and major incident reaction techniques. In addition the FMR also trained for air mobile operations using Bell 212 helicopters to rapidly insert into trouble areas.

In contrast to the merely military duties of FMR came the rescue operation of civilians following the Israel Defense Forces IDF Qana shelling during the IDF Operation Grapes of Wrath in the 1996 Lebanon war.

== Gallery ==
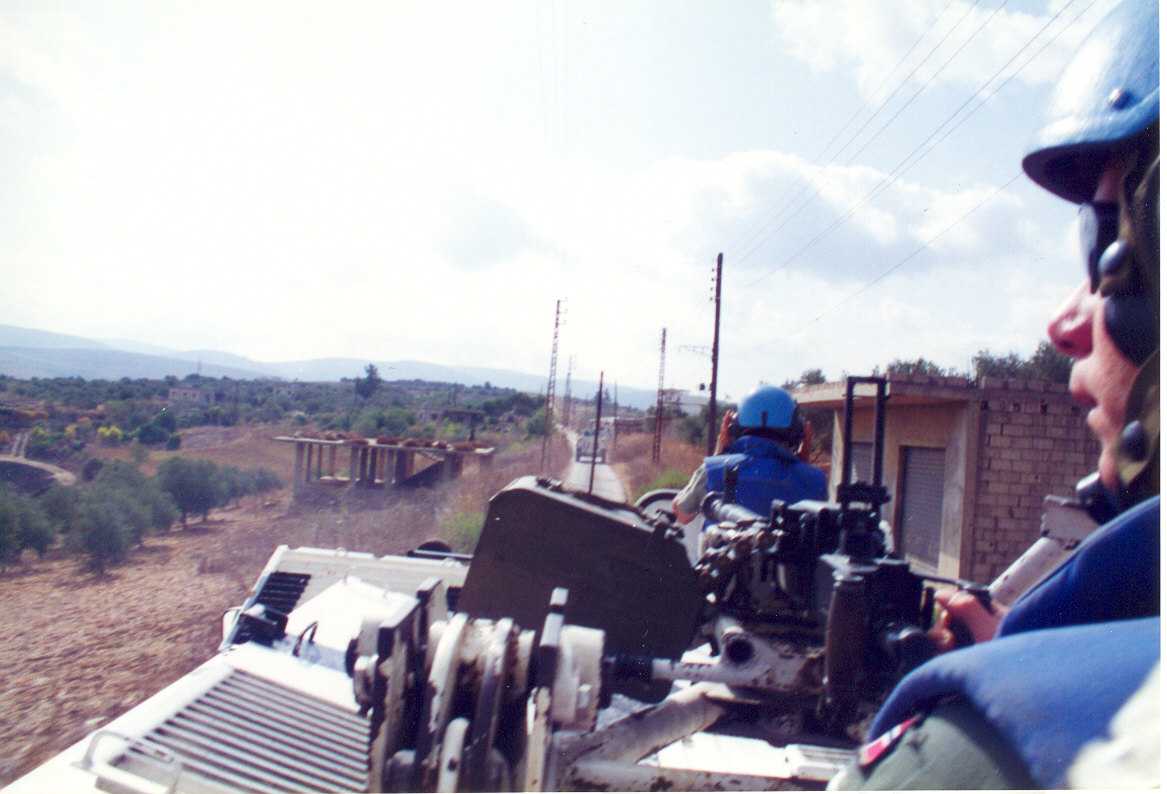
Norplatoon FMR on patrol

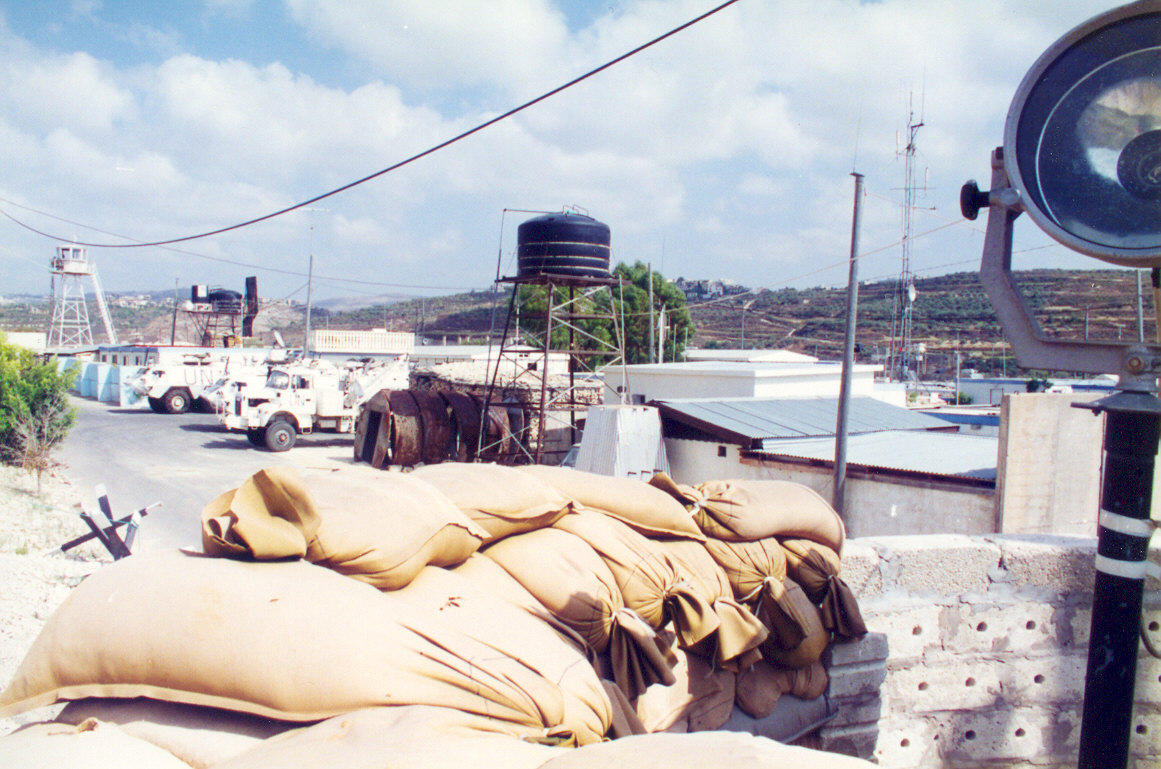
FMR base, Camp Grotle

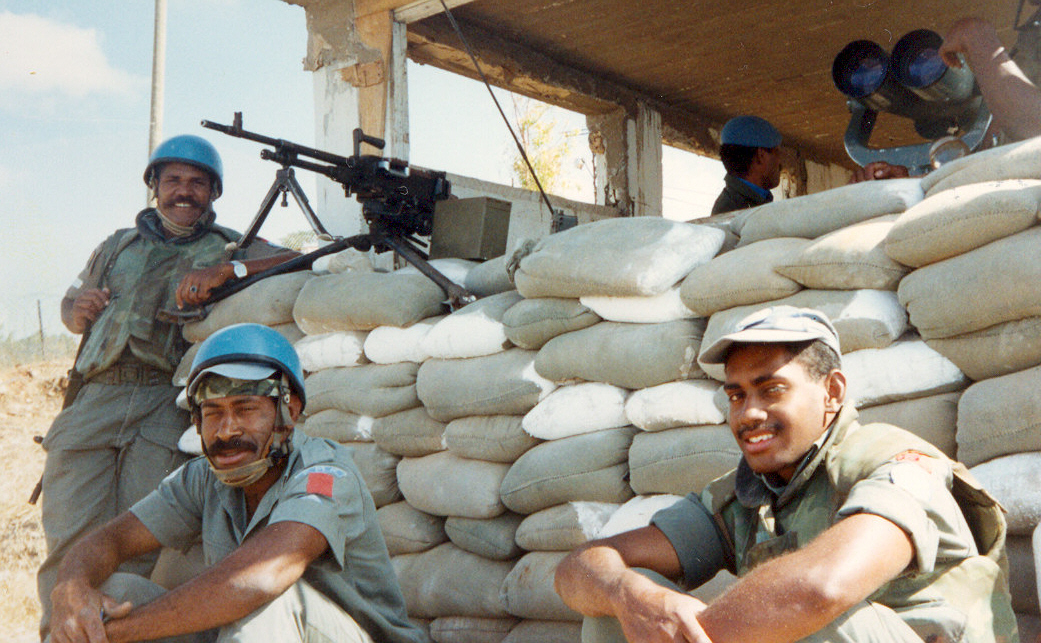
FMR visiting UNIFIL OP
