= John Knox (chemist) =

British chemist and academic (1927–2018)

John Henderson Knox FRS (1927 – 15 October 2018) was a Professor of Physical Chemistry at the University of Edinburgh and is considered a distinguished contributor to the fields of reaction kinetics and chromatography.

== Contributions to chemistry ==
John Knox was an early leader in the field of gas chromatography. As a PhD student in at Pembroke College, Cambridge, in 1953 Knox, together with his fellow student Howard Purnell, constructed a self-designed gas chromatographer in their lab and used this to pioneer early research in the field. In later experiments Knox was the first to use gas chromatography to measure rate of reaction constants for gaseous chemical reactions. This work enabled greater understanding of mechanisms of combustion and chlorination reactions in science.

During a sabbatical with Prof JC Giddings in Utah in 1964, Knox was introduced to column liquid chromatography. Back home in 1969, he published a landmark paper with Mohammed Saleem, which suggested that the highest speed in liquid chromatography would be obtained by using 2 micron porous particles. In the 1970s Knox and his Edinburgh research group invented new micro-particulate packing materials for liquid chromatography, now marketed under the trade name Hypersil. He also invented porous graphitic carbon (now Hypercarb), creating an alternative packing material to silica gels for the industry.

Knox's work over this period included development of the Knox Equation, now used commonly to describe the spreading of a solute into bands in liquid chromatography.

John Knox was elected a Fellow of the Royal Society of Edinburgh in 1971 and a Fellow of the Royal Society of London in 1984. Knox was awarded the Golay Medal for Capillary Chromatography in 2000. Since 2008 the Royal Society of Chemistry's Separation Science Group has honoured his contributions with the Knox Award to recognise individuals for influential work in the field.

== Contributions to yachting ==
In retirement John Knox pursued his lifelong interest in yachting, applying scientific rigour to the field of anchoring.

He invented the Anchorwatch, a strain gauge which measures the force on an anchor chain, in order to alert crew when their anchor is at risk of slipping during a stormy night.

Knox used the Anchorwatch device to establish a testing procedure for measuring an anchor's holding force, and conducted years of experiments on Scotland's beaches to measure the efficiency of most anchor designs available on the global market.

His work on anchor testing culminated in the design of his own optimised Knox Anchor, now commercially manufactured in the UK.

== Personal life ==
John Knox celebrated 60 years of marriage to his wife Josephine in March 2017.

He died on 15 October 2018 in Edinburgh, aged 90. He is survived by his wife, four sons, 12 grandchildren, and 4 great-grandchildren.
