= Anchor =

Device used to secure a vessel to the seabed

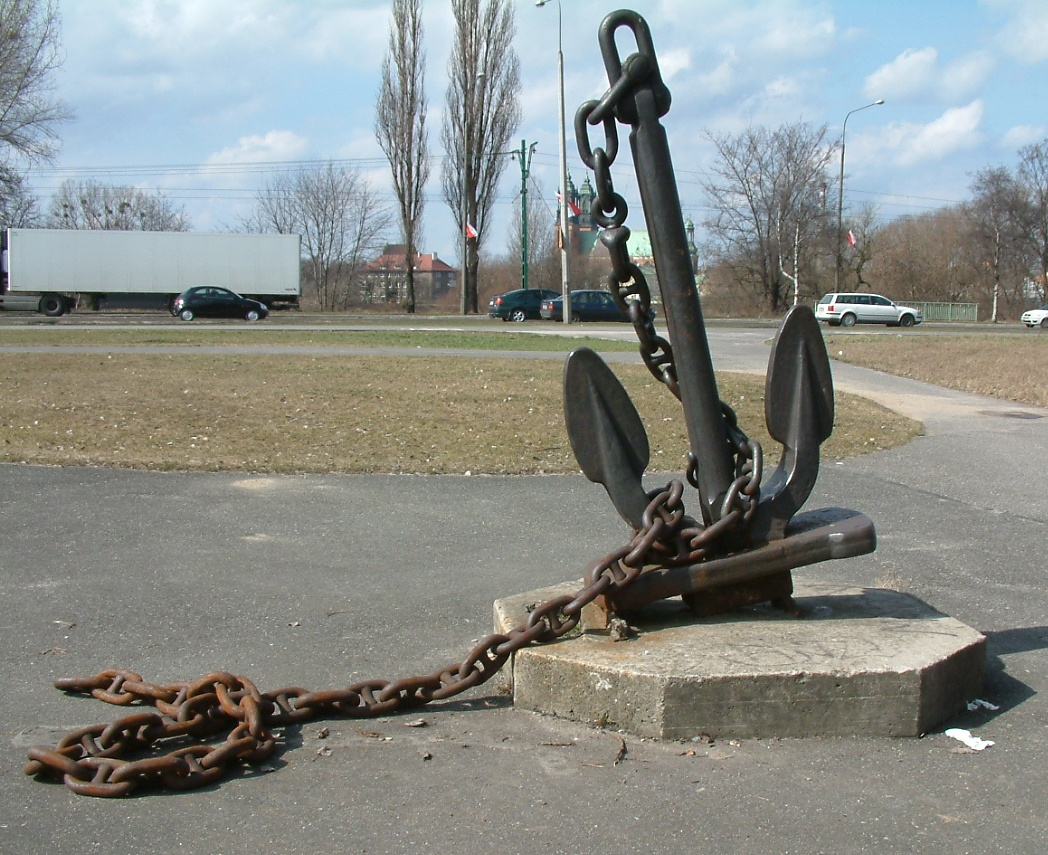
Stockless ship's anchor and chain on display

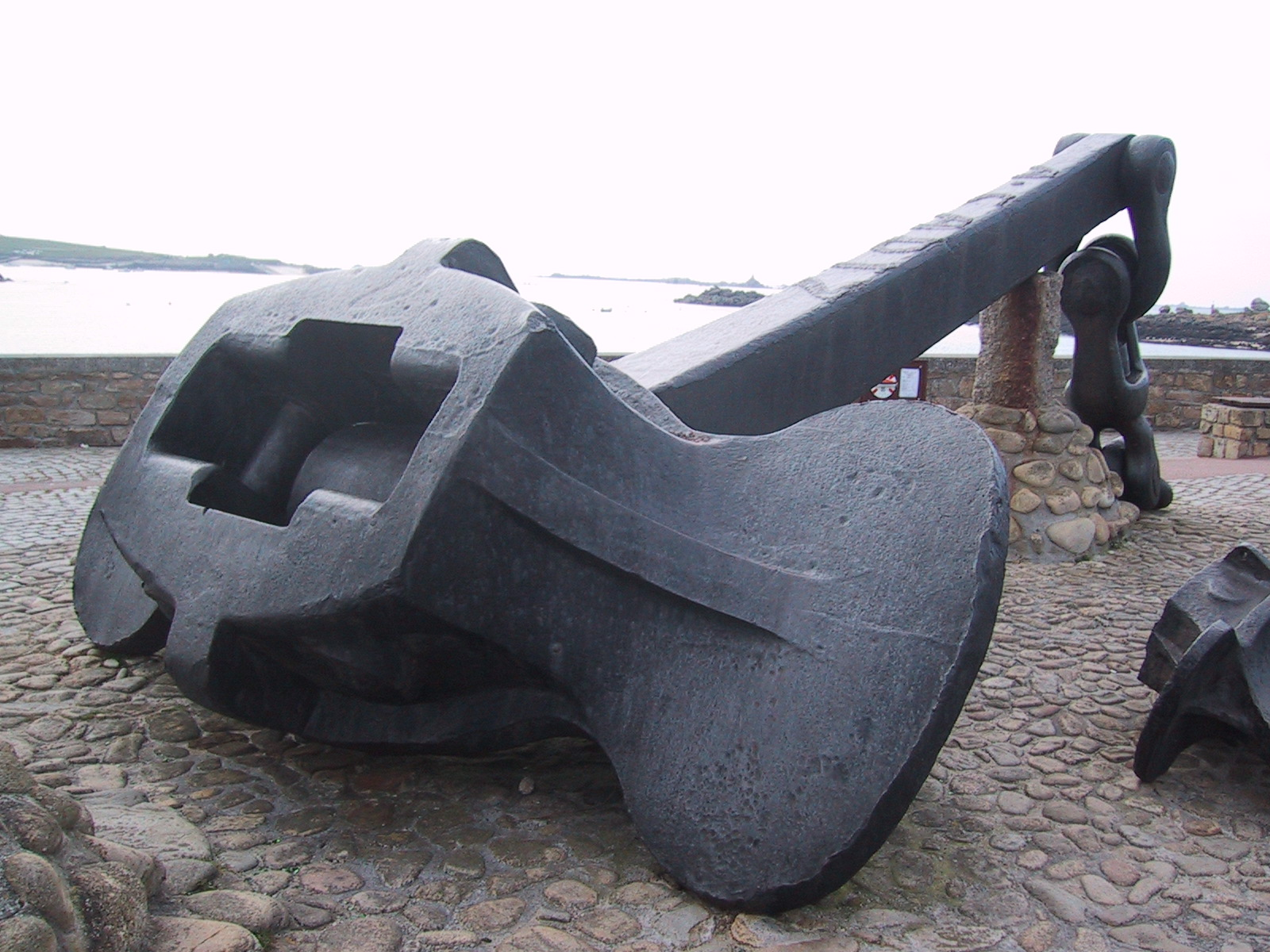
Anchor of Amoco Cadiz in Portsall, north-west Brittany, France

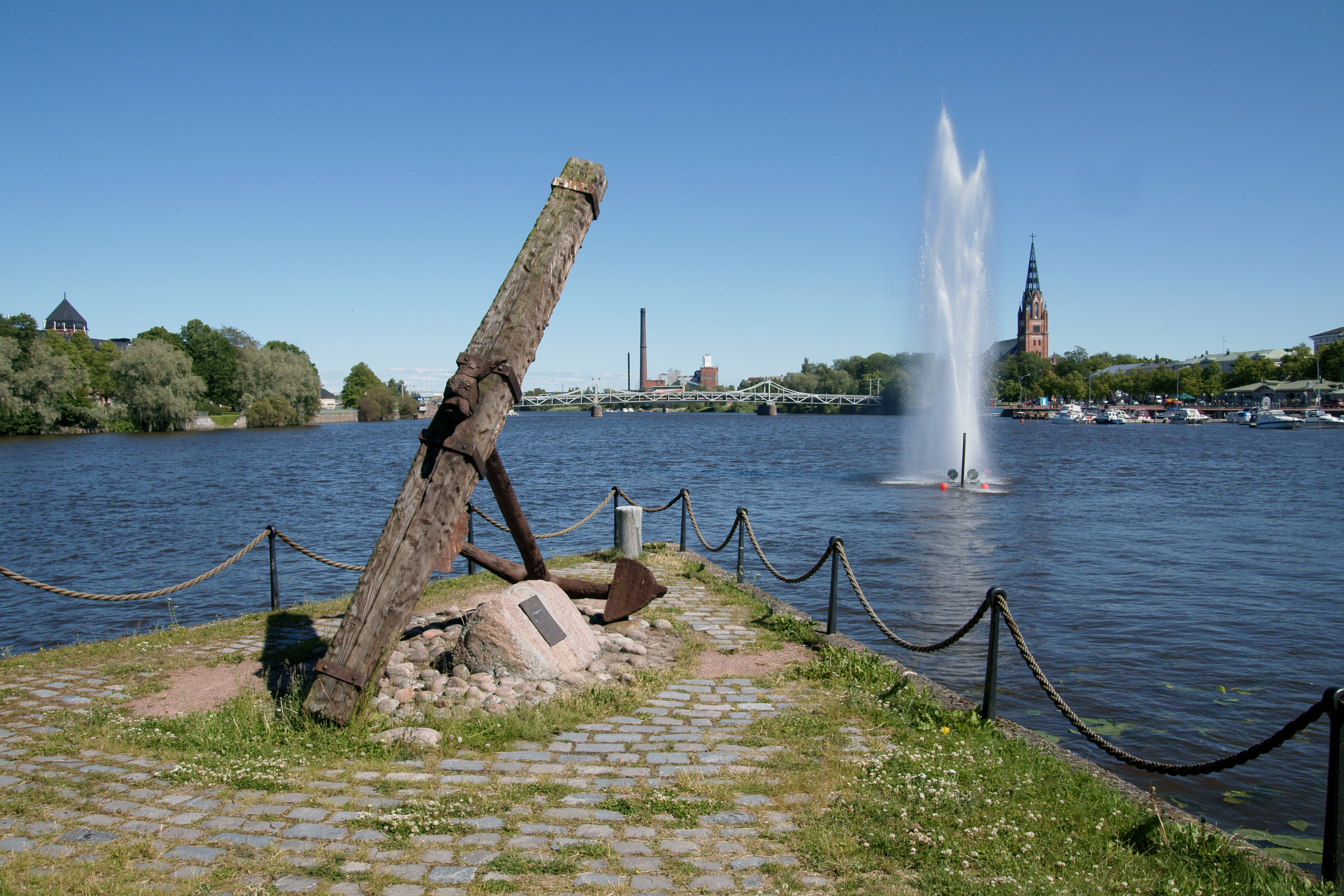
Memorial anchor in Kirjurinluoto, Pori, Finland

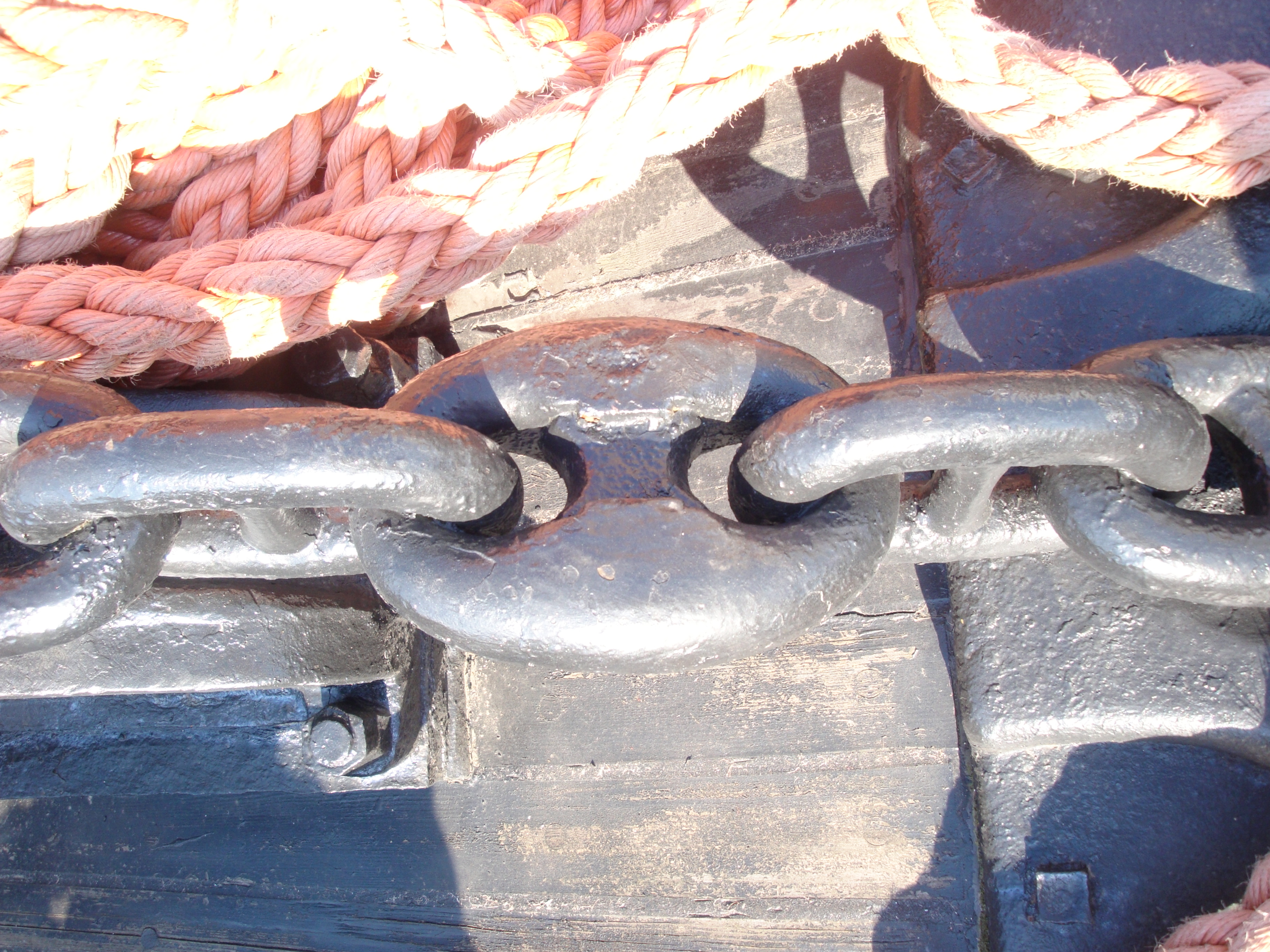
Massive anchor chain for large ships. The weight of the chain is vital for proper holding of the anchor.

An anchor is a device, normally made of metal, used to secure a vessel to the bed of a body of water to prevent the craft from drifting due to wind or current. The word derives from Latin ancora, which itself comes from the Greek ἄγκυρα (ankȳra).

Anchors can either be temporary or permanent. Permanent anchors are used in the creation of a mooring, and are rarely moved; a specialist service is normally needed to move or maintain them. Vessels carry one or more temporary anchors, which may be of different designs and weights.

A sea anchor is a drag device, not in contact with the seabed, used to minimize drift of a vessel relative to the water. A drogue is a drag device used to slow or help steer a vessel running before a storm in a following or overtaking sea, or when crossing a bar in a breaking sea.

== Anchoring ==
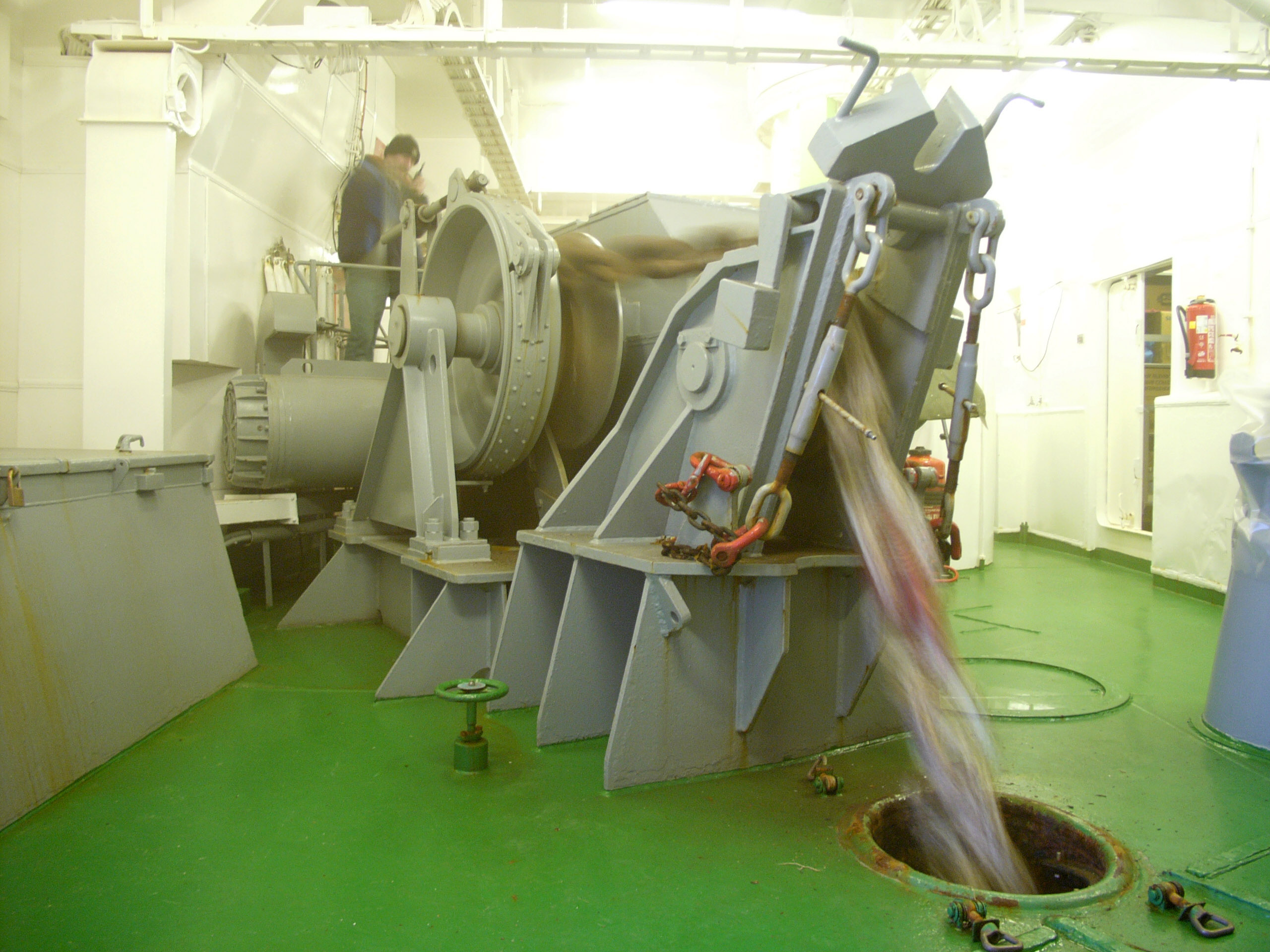
Anchor winch, or windlass, on RV Polarstern

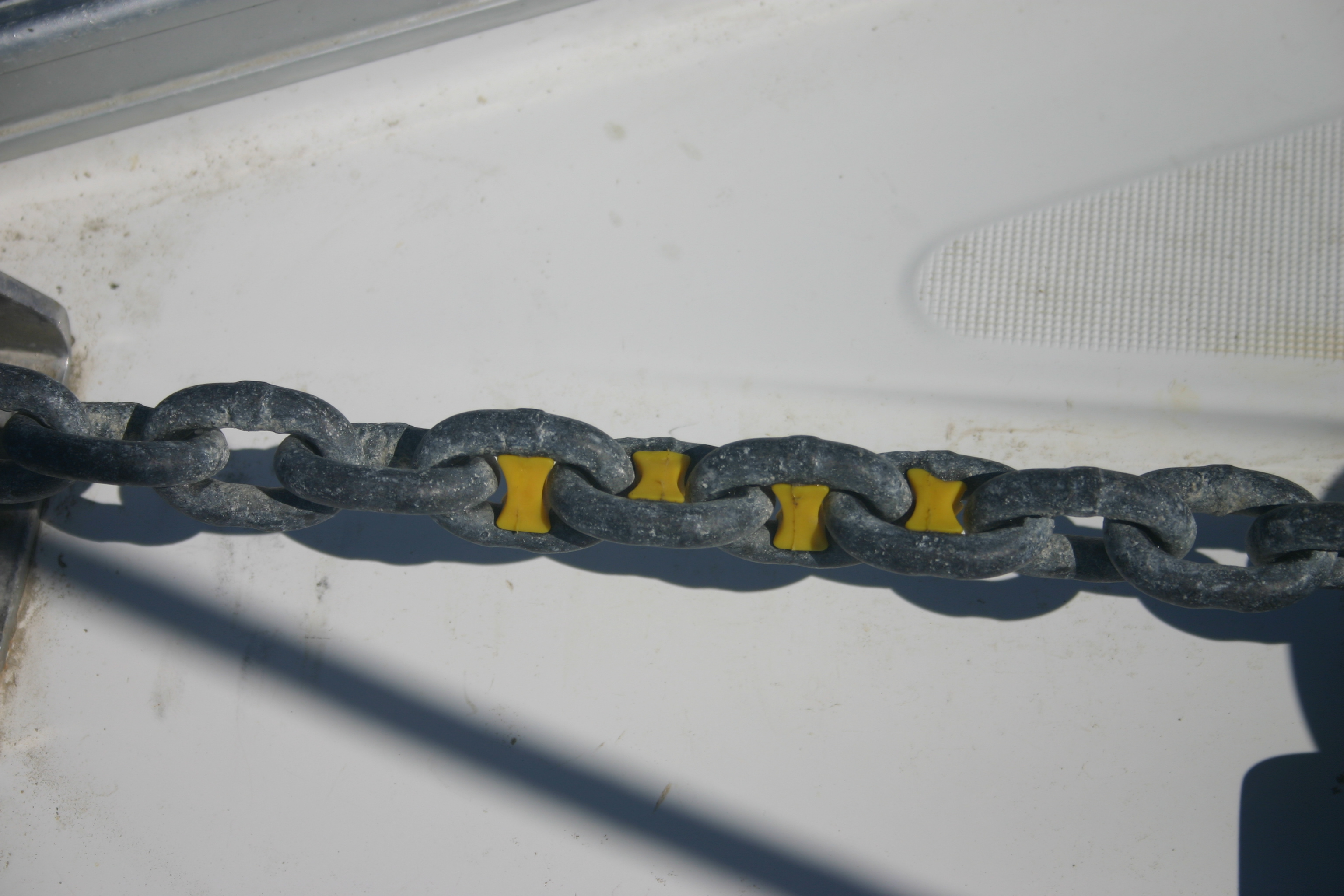
Colored plastic inserts on a modern anchor chain show the operator how much chain has been paid out. This knowledge is crucial in all anchoring methods.

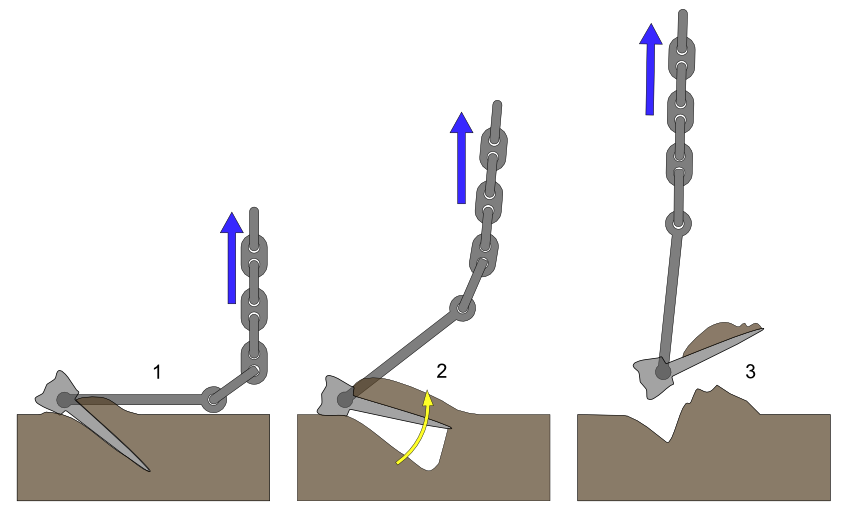
A stockless anchor being broken out

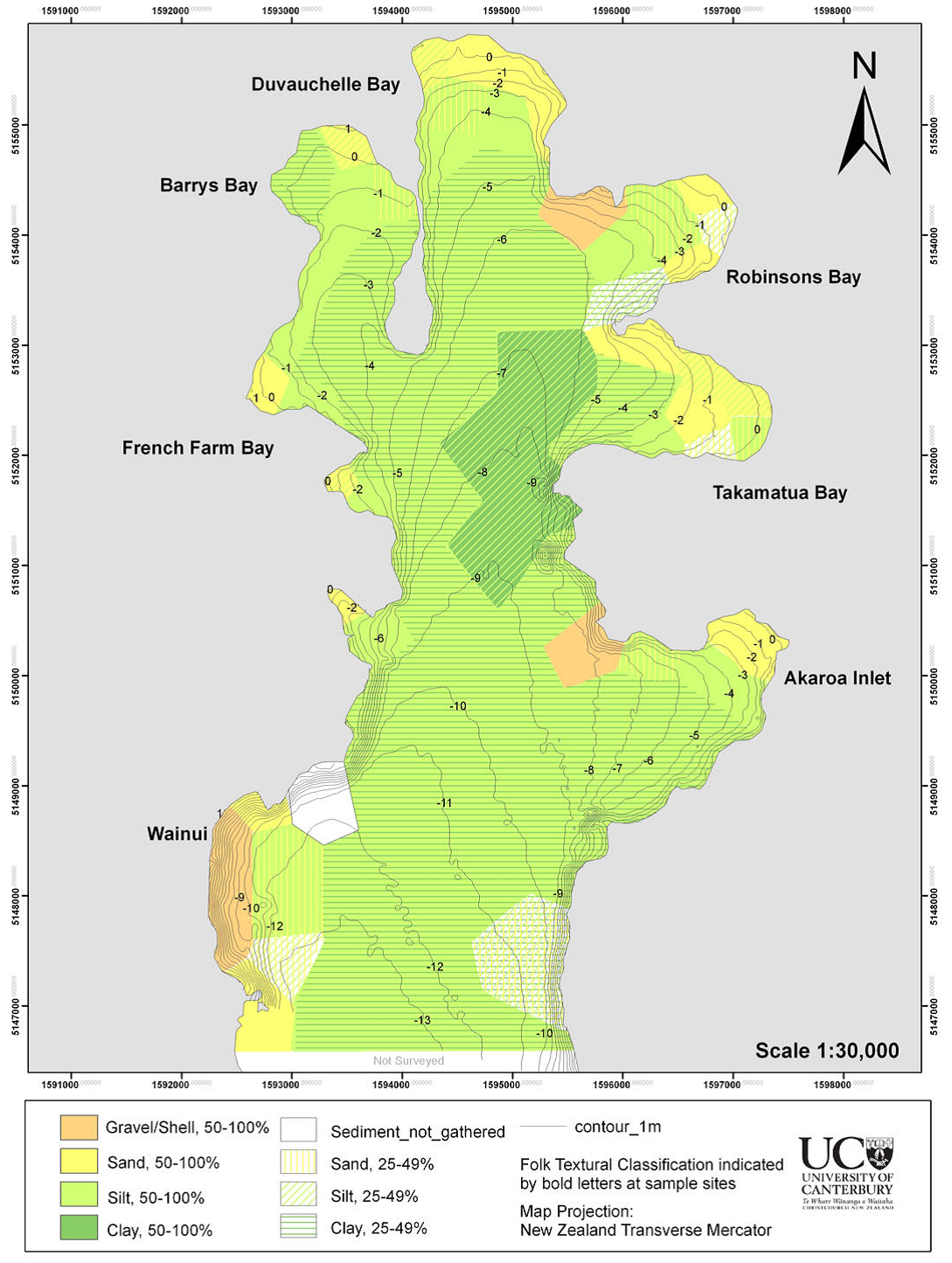
Holding ground in Akaroa Harbour

Anchors achieve holding power either by "hooking" into the seabed, or weight, or a combination of the two. The weight of the anchor chain can be more than that of the anchor and is critical to proper holding. Permanent moorings use large masses (commonly a block or slab of concrete) resting on the seabed. Semi-permanent mooring anchors (such as mushroom anchors) and large ship's anchors derive a significant portion of their holding power from their weight, while also hooking or embedding in the bottom. Modern anchors for smaller vessels have metal flukes that hook on to rocks on the bottom or bury themselves in soft seabed.

The vessel is attached to the anchor by the rode (also called a cable or a warp). It can be made of rope, chain or a combination of rope and chain. The ratio of the length of rode to the water depth is known as the scope.

Holding ground is the area of sea floor that holds an anchor, and thus the attached ship or boat. Different types of anchor are designed to hold in different types of holding ground. Some bottom materials hold better than others; for instance, hard sand holds well, shell holds poorly. Holding ground may be fouled with obstacles. An anchorage location may be chosen for its holding ground. In poor holding ground, only the weight of an anchor and chain matters; in good holding ground, it is able to dig in, and the holding power can be significantly higher. The basic anchoring consists of determining the location, dropping the anchor, laying out the scope, setting the hook, and assessing where the vessel ends up. The ship seeks a location that is sufficiently protected; has suitable holding ground, enough depth at low tide and enough room for the boat to swing.

The location to drop the anchor should be approached from down wind or down current, whichever is stronger. As the chosen spot is approached, the vessel should be stopped or even beginning to drift back. The anchor should initially be lowered quickly but under control until it is on the bottom (see anchor windlass). The vessel should continue to drift back, and the cable should be veered out under control (slowly) so it is relatively straight.

Once the desired scope is laid out, the vessel should be gently forced astern, usually using the auxiliary motor but possibly by backing a sail. A hand on the anchor line may telegraph a series of jerks and jolts, indicating the anchor is dragging, or a smooth tension indicative of digging in. As the anchor begins to dig in and resist backward force, the engine may be throttled up to get a thorough set. If the anchor continues to drag, or sets after having dragged too far, it should be retrieved and moved back to the desired position (or another location chosen.)

=== Using an anchor weight, kellet or sentinel ===
Lowering a concentrated, heavy weight down the anchor line – rope or chain – directly in front of the bow to the seabed behaves like a heavy chain rode and lowers the angle of pull on the anchor. If the weight is suspended off the seabed it acts as a spring or shock absorber to dampen the sudden actions that are normally transmitted to the anchor and can cause it to dislodge and drag. In light conditions, a kellet reduces the swing of the vessel considerably. In heavier conditions these effects disappear as the rode becomes straightened and the weight ineffective. Known as an "anchor chum weight" or "angel" in the UK.

=== Forked moor ===
Using two anchors set approximately 45° apart, or wider angles up to 90°, from the bow is a strong mooring for facing into strong winds. To set anchors in this way, first one anchor is set in the normal fashion. Then, taking in on the first cable as the boat is motored into the wind and letting slack while drifting back, a second anchor is set approximately a half-scope away from the first on a line perpendicular to the wind. After this second anchor is set, the scope on the first is taken up until the vessel is lying between the two anchors and the load is taken equally on each cable. This moor also to some degree limits the range of a vessel's swing to a narrower oval. Care should be taken that other vessels do not swing down on the boat due to the limited swing range.

=== Bow and stern ===
(Not to be mistaken with the Bahamian moor, below.) In the bow and stern technique, an anchor is set off each the bow and the stern, which can severely limit a vessel's swing range and also align it to steady wind, current or wave conditions. One method of accomplishing this moor is to set a bow anchor normally, then drop back to the limit of the bow cable (or to double the desired scope, e.g. 8:1 if the eventual scope should be 4:1, 10:1 if the eventual scope should be 5:1, etc.) to lower a stern anchor. By taking up on the bow cable the stern anchor can be set. After both anchors are set, tension is taken up on both cables to limit the swing or to align the vessel.

=== Bahamian moor ===
Similar to the above, a Bahamian moor is used to sharply limit the swing range of a vessel, but allows it to swing to a current. One of the primary characteristics of this technique is the use of a swivel as follows: the first anchor is set normally, and the vessel drops back to the limit of anchor cable. A second anchor is attached to the end of the anchor cable, and is dropped and set. A swivel is attached to the middle of the anchor cable, and the vessel connected to that.

The vessel now swings in the middle of two anchors, which is acceptable in strong reversing currents, but a wind perpendicular to the current may break out the anchors, as they are not aligned for this load.

=== Backing an anchor ===
Also known as tandem anchoring, in this technique two anchors are deployed in line with each other, on the same rode. With the foremost anchor reducing the load on the aft-most, this technique can develop great holding power and may be appropriate in "ultimate storm" circumstances. It does not limit swinging range, and might not be suitable in some circumstances. There are complications, and the technique requires careful preparation and a level of skill and experience above that required for a single anchor.

=== Kedging ===
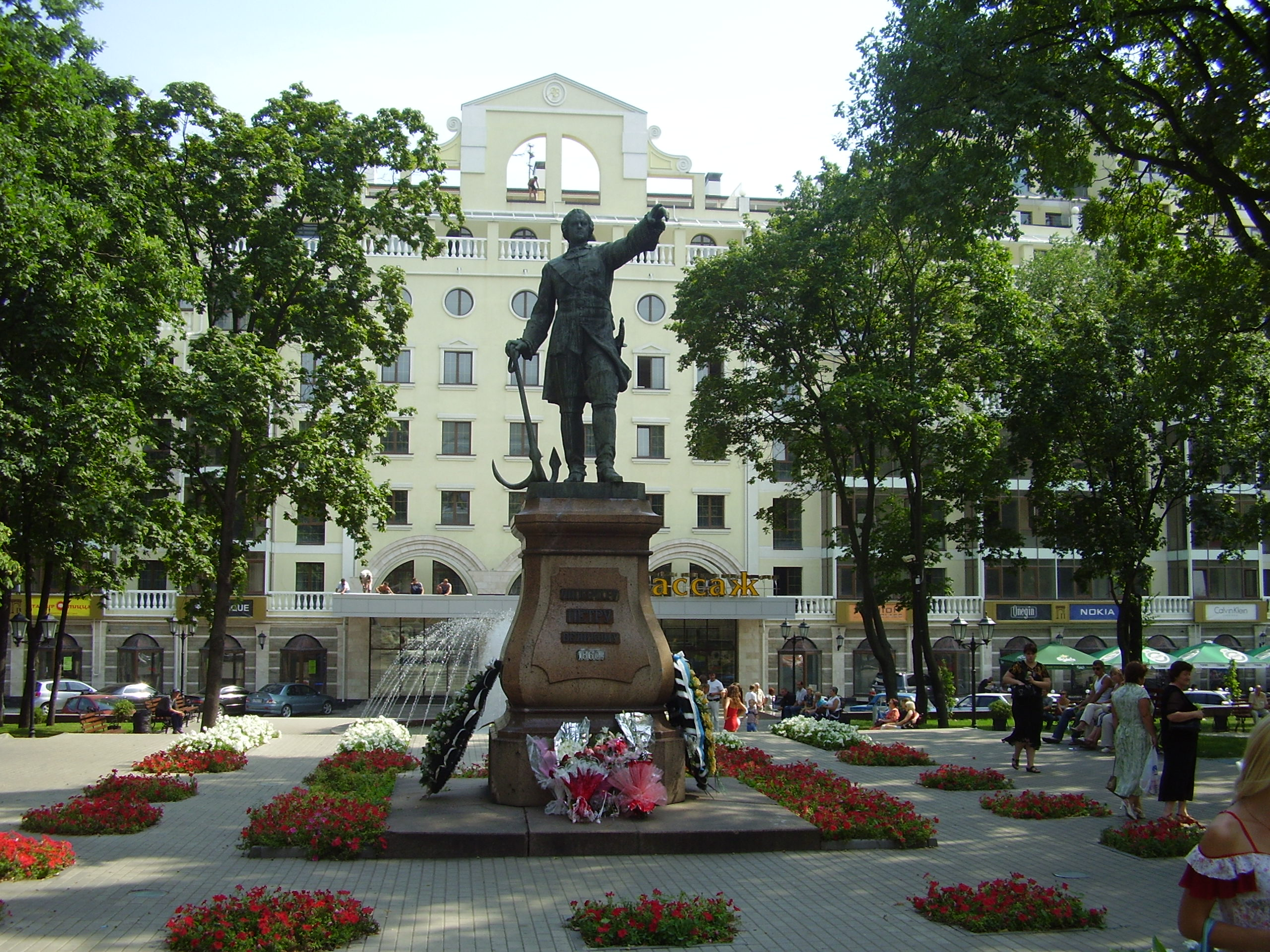
Statue of Peter the Great in Voronezh, Russia. He is leaning on an anchor, symbolic of his contributions to modernizing and expanding Russia's navy (1860)

Kedging or warping is a technique for moving or turning a ship by using a relatively light anchor.

In yachts, a kedge anchor is an anchor carried in addition to the main, or bower, anchor, and usually stowed aft. Every yacht should carry at least two anchors – the main or bower anchor and a second lighter kedge anchor. It is used occasionally when it is necessary to limit the turning circle as the yacht swings when it is anchored, such as in a narrow river or a deep pool in an otherwise shallow area. Kedge anchors are sometimes used to recover vessels that have run aground.

For ships, a kedge may be dropped while a ship is underway, or carried out in a suitable direction by a tender or ship's boat to enable the ship to be winched off if aground or swung into a particular heading, or even to be held steady against a tidal or other stream.

Historically, it was of particular relevance to sailing warships that used them to outmaneuver opponents when the wind had dropped but might be used by any vessel in confined, shoal water to place it in a more desirable position, provided she had enough manpower.

==== Club hauling ====
Club hauling is an archaic technique. When a vessel is in a narrow channel or on a lee shore so that there is no room to tack the vessel in a conventional manner, an anchor attached to the lee quarter may be dropped from the lee bow. This is deployed when the vessel is head to wind and has lost headway. As the vessel gathers sternway the strain on the cable pivots the vessel around what is now the weather quarter turning the vessel onto the other tack. The anchor is then normally cut away (the ship's momentum prevents recovery without aborting the maneuver).

=== Multiple anchor patterns ===
When it is necessary to moor a ship or floating platform with precise positioning and alignment, such as when drilling the seabed, for some types of salvage work, and for some types of diving operation, several anchors are set in a pattern which allows the vessel to be positioned by shortening and lengthening the scope of the anchors, and adjusting the tension on the rodes. The anchors are usually laid in prearranged positions by an anchor tender, and the moored vessel uses its own winches to adjust position and tension.

Similar arrangements are used for some types of single buoy moorings, like the catenary anchor leg mooring (CALM) used for loading and unloading liquid cargoes.

=== Weighing anchor ===
Since all anchors that embed themselves in the bottom require the strain to be along the seabed, anchors can be broken out of the bottom by shortening the rope until the vessel is directly above the anchor; at this point the anchor chain is "up and down", in naval parlance. If necessary, motoring slowly around the location of the anchor also helps dislodge it. Anchors are sometimes fitted with a trip line attached to the crown, by which they can be unhooked from underwater hazards.

The term aweigh describes an anchor when it is hanging on the rope and not resting on the bottom. This is linked to the term to weigh anchor, meaning to lift the anchor from the sea bed, allowing the ship or boat to move. An anchor is described as aweigh when it has been broken out of the bottom and is being hauled up to be stowed. Aweigh should not be confused with under way, which describes a vessel that is not moored to a dock or anchored, whether or not the vessel is moving through the water. Aweigh is also often confused with away, which is incorrect.

== History ==
=== Evolution of the anchor ===
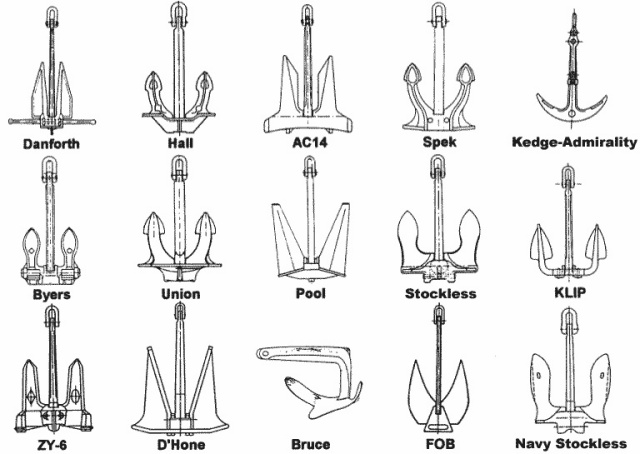
Anchors come in a wide variety of shapes, types, and sizes for different conditions, functions and vessels.

The earliest anchors were probably rocks, and many rock anchors have been found dating from at least the Bronze Age. Pre-European Māori waka (canoes) used one or more hollowed stones, tied with flax ropes, as anchors. Many modern moorings still rely on a large rock as the primary element of their design. However, using pure weight to resist the forces of a storm works well only as a permanent mooring; a large enough rock would be nearly impossible to move to a new location.

The ancient Greeks used baskets of stones, large sacks filled with sand, and wooden logs filled with lead as a weight for their ships. Influential authors such as Apollonius Rhodius and Stephen of Byzantium also show that they may be made out of wood, Athenaeus also referring to anchors made out of metals. Such anchors held the vessel merely by their weight and by their friction along the bottom.

=== Anchor parts ===
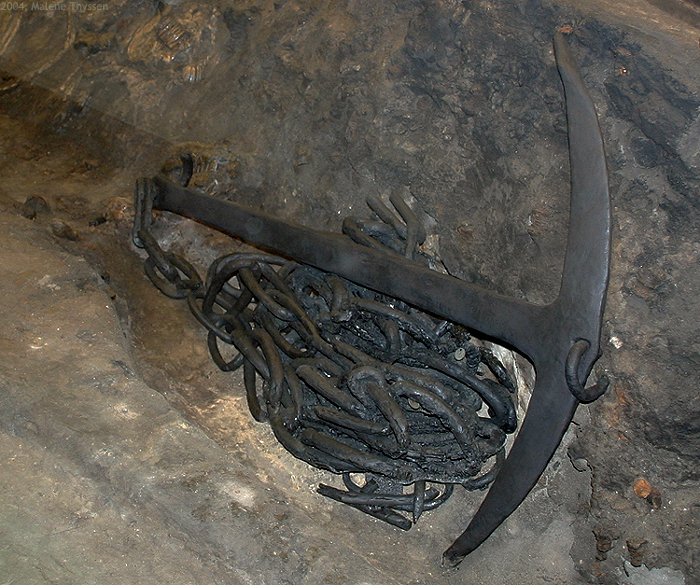
Anchor of the Ladby Ship

An anchor grips the sea floor with flukes, pointed iron teeth. [An anchor], "the honest, rough piece of iron, so simple in appearance, has more parts than the human body has limbs: the ring, the stock, the crown, the flukes, the palms, the shank."

This form has been used since antiquity. The Roman Nemi ships of the 1st century AD used this form. The Viking Ladby ship (probably 10th century) used a fluked anchor of this type, made of iron, which would have had a wooden stock mounted perpendicular to the shank and flukes to make the flukes contact the bottom at a suitable angle to hook or penetrate.

=== Admiralty anchor ===
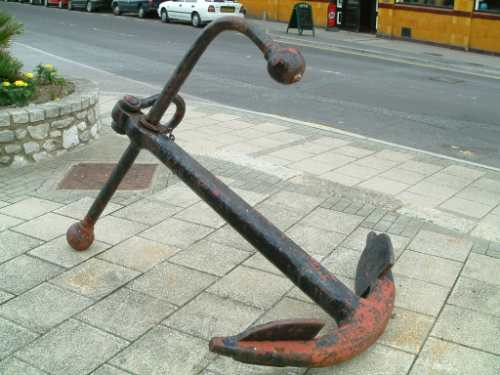
An Admiralty Pattern anchor; when deployed on the seafloor the stock forces one of its flukes into the bottom.

The Admiralty Pattern anchor, or simply "Admiralty", also known as a "Fisherman", consists of a central shank with a ring or shackle for attaching the rode (the rope, chain, or cable connecting the ship and the anchor). At the other end of the shank there are two arms, carrying the flukes, while the stock is mounted to the shackle end, at ninety degrees to the arms. When the anchor lands on the bottom, it generally falls over with the arms parallel to the seabed. As a strain comes onto the rope, the stock digs into the bottom, canting the anchor until one of the flukes catches and digs into the bottom.

The Admiralty Anchor is an entirely independent reinvention of a classical design, as seen in one of the Nemi ship anchors. This basic design remained unchanged for centuries, with the most significant changes being to the overall proportions, and a move from stocks made of wood to iron stocks in the late 1830s and early 1840s.

Since one fluke always protrudes up from the set anchor, there is a great tendency of the rope to foul the anchor as the vessel swings due to wind or current shifts. When this happens, the anchor may be pulled out of the bottom, and in some cases may need to be hauled up to be re-set. In the mid-19th century, numerous modifications were attempted to alleviate these problems, as well as improve holding power, including one-armed mooring anchors. The most successful of these patent anchors, the Trotman Anchor, introduced a pivot at the centre of the crown where the arms join the shank, allowing the "idle" upper arm to fold against the shank. When deployed the lower arm may fold against the shank tilting the tip of the fluke upwards, so each fluke has a tripping palm at its base, to hook on the bottom as the folded arm drags along the seabed, which unfolds the downward oriented arm until the tip of the fluke can engage the bottom.

Handling and storage of these anchors requires special equipment and procedures. Once the anchor is hauled up to the hawsepipe, the ring end is hoisted up to the end of a timber projecting from the bow known as the cathead. The crown of the anchor is then hauled up with a heavy tackle until one fluke can be hooked over the rail. This is known as "catting and fishing" the anchor. Before dropping the anchor, the fishing process is reversed, and the anchor is dropped from the end of the cathead.

=== Stockless anchor ===
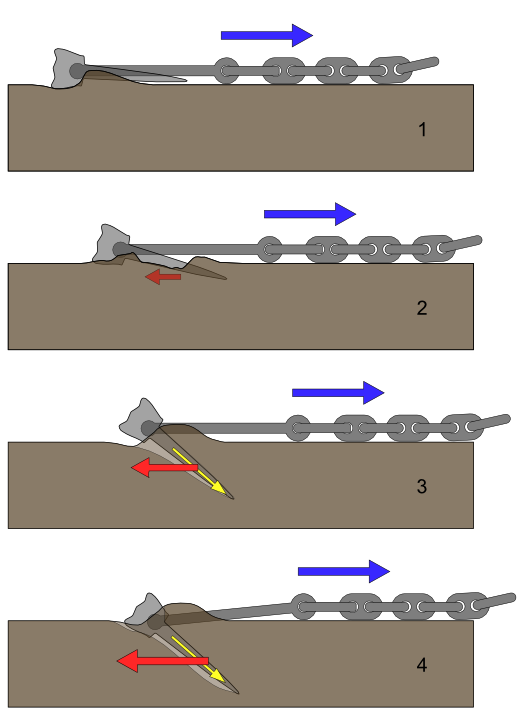
The action of a stockless anchor being set

The stockless anchor, patented in England in 1821, represented the first significant departure in anchor design in centuries. Although their holding-power-to-weight ratio is significantly lower than admiralty pattern anchors, their ease of handling and stowage aboard large ships led to almost universal adoption. In contrast to the elaborate stowage procedures for earlier anchors, stockless anchors are simply hauled up until they rest with the shank inside the hawsepipes, and the flukes against the hull (or inside a recess in the hull called the anchor box).

While there are numerous variations, stockless anchors consist of a set of heavy flukes connected by a pivot or ball and socket joint to a shank. Cast into the crown of the anchor is a set of tripping palms, projections that drag on the bottom, forcing the main flukes to dig in.

== Small boat anchors ==
Until the mid-20th century, anchors for smaller vessels were either scaled-down versions of admiralty anchors, or simple grapnels. As new designs with greater holding-power-to-weight ratios were sought, a great variety of anchor designs have emerged. Many of these designs are still under patent, and other types are best known by their original trademarked names.

=== Grapnel anchor / drag ===
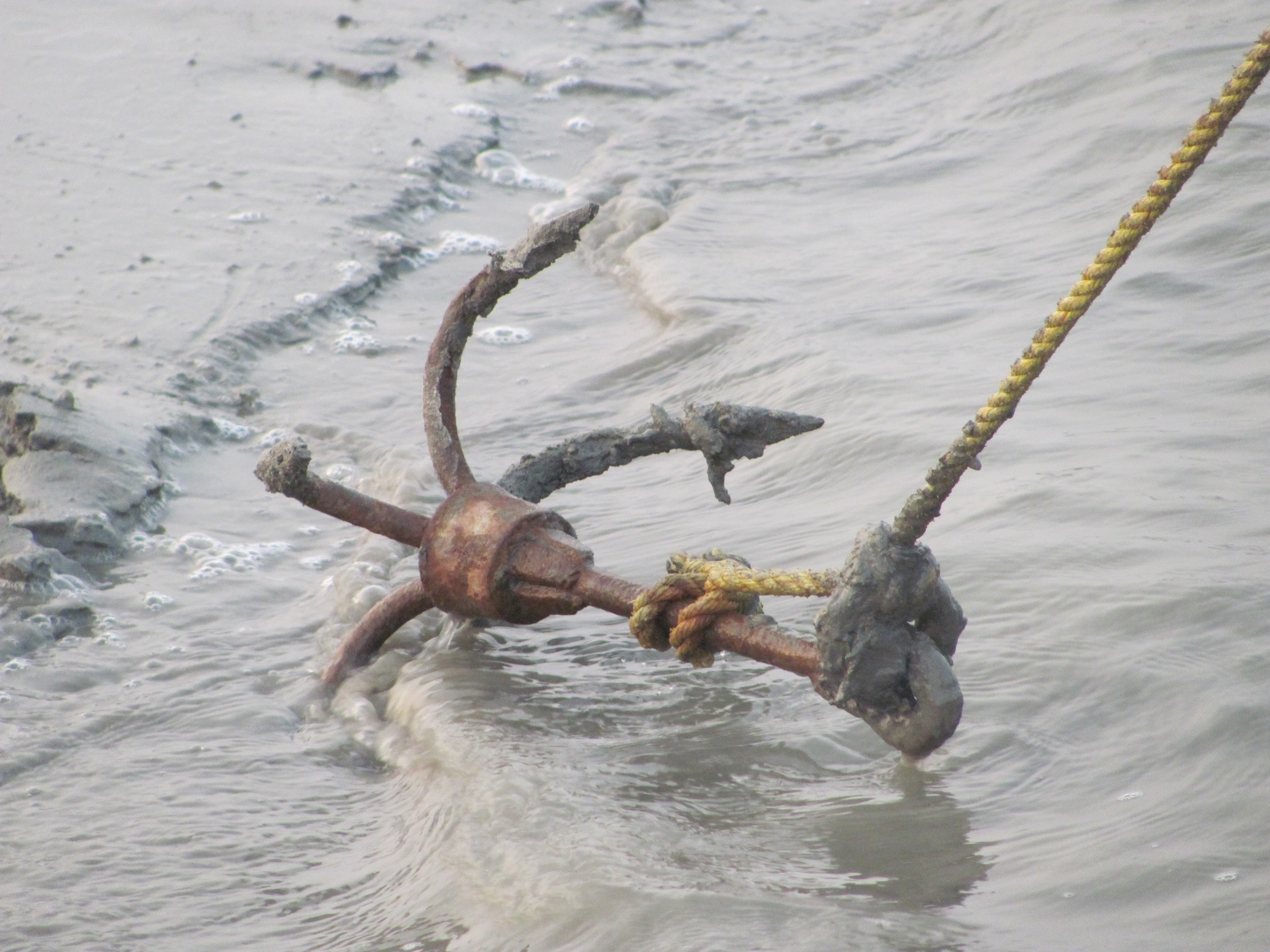
A grapnel anchor

A traditional design, the grapnel is merely a shank (no stock) with four or more tines, also known as a drag. It has a benefit in that, no matter how it reaches the bottom, one or more tines are aimed to set. In coral, or rock, it is often able to set quickly by hooking into the structure, but may be more difficult to retrieve. A grapnel is often quite light, and may have additional uses as a tool to recover gear lost overboard. Its weight also makes it relatively easy to move and carry, however its shape is generally not compact and it may be awkward to stow unless a collapsing model is used.

Grapnels rarely have enough fluke area to develop much hold in sand, clay, or mud. It is not unknown for the anchor to foul on its own rode, or to foul the tines with refuse from the bottom, preventing it from digging in. On the other hand, it is quite possible for this anchor to find such a good hook that, without a trip line from the crown, it is impossible to retrieve.

=== Herreshoff anchor ===
Designed by yacht designer L. Francis Herreshoff, this is essentially the same pattern as an admiralty anchor, albeit with small diamond-shaped flukes or palms. The novelty of the design lay in the means by which it could be broken down into three pieces for stowage. In use, it still presents all the issues of the admiralty pattern anchor.

=== Northill anchor ===
Originally designed as a lightweight anchor for seaplanes, this design consists of two plough-like blades mounted to a shank, with a folding stock crossing through the crown of the anchor.

=== CQR plough anchor ===
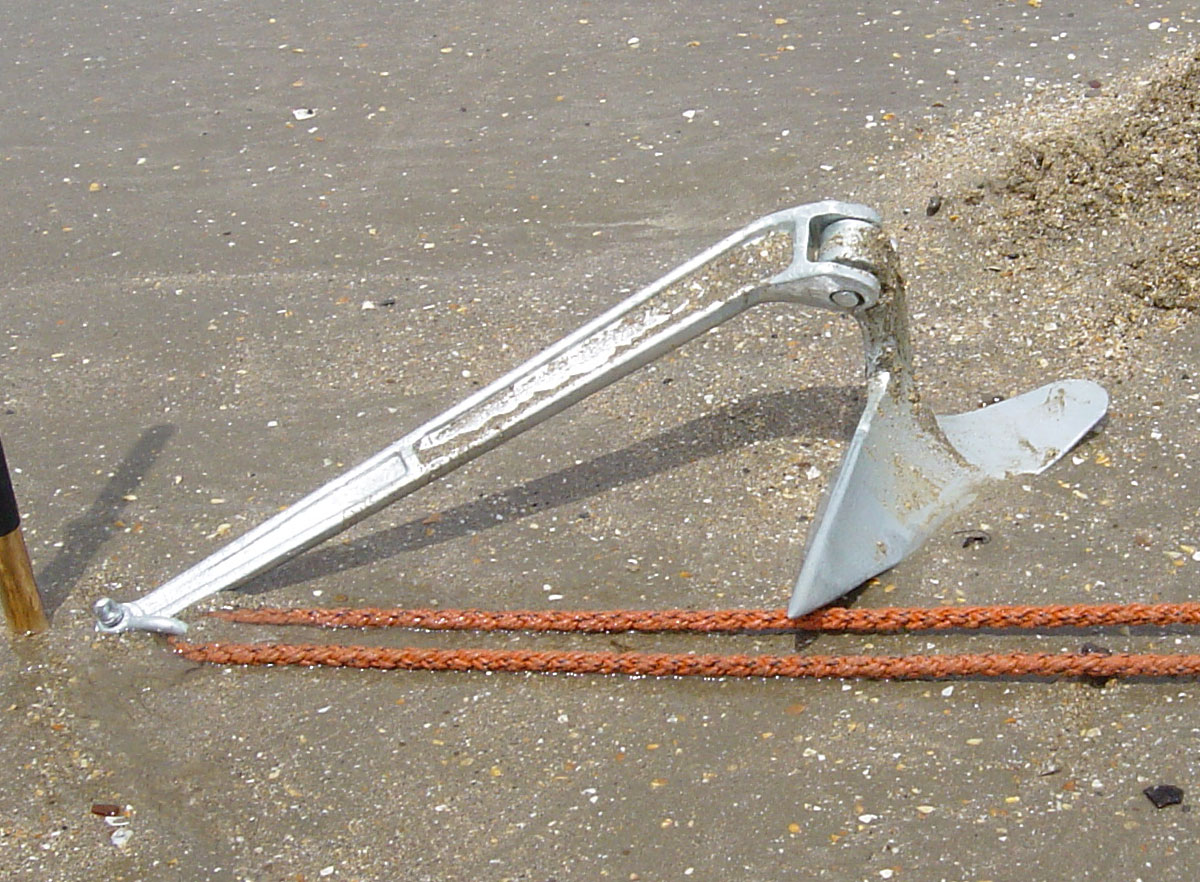
A CQR plough anchor

Many manufacturers produce a plough-type anchor, so-named after its resemblance to an agricultural plough. All such anchors are copied from the original CQR (Coastal Quick Release, or Clyde Quick Release, later rebranded as 'secure' by Lewmar), a 1933 design patented in the UK by mathematician Geoffrey Ingram Taylor.

Plough anchors stow conveniently in a roller at the bow, and have been popular with cruising sailors and private boaters. Ploughs can be moderately good in all types of seafloor, though not exceptional in any. Contrary to popular belief, the CQR's hinged shank is not to allow the anchor to turn with direction changes rather than breaking out, but actually to prevent the shank's weight from disrupting the fluke's orientation while setting. The hinge can wear out and may trap a sailor's fingers. Some later plough anchors have a rigid shank, such as the Lewmar's "Delta".

A plough anchor has a fundamental flaw: like its namesake, the agricultural plough, it digs in but then tends to break out back to the surface. Plough anchors sometimes have difficulty setting at all, and instead skip across the seafloor. By contrast, modern efficient anchors tend to be "scoop" types that dig ever deeper.

=== Delta anchor ===
The Delta anchor was derived from the CQR. It was patented by Philip McCarron, James Stewart, and Gordon Lyall of British marine manufacturer Simpson-Lawrence Ltd in 1992. It was designed as an advance over the anchors used for floating systems such as oil rigs. It retains the weighted tip of the CQR but has a much higher fluke area to weight ratio than its predecessor. The designers also eliminated the sometimes troublesome hinge. It is a plough anchor with a rigid, arched shank. It is described as self-launching because it can be dropped from a bow roller simply by paying out the rode, without manual assistance. This is an oft copied design with the European Brake and Australian Sarca Excel being two of the more notable ones. Although it is a plough type anchor, it sets and holds reasonably well in hard bottoms.

=== Danforth anchor ===
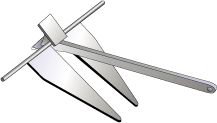
The Danforth is a light, versatile, highly popular fluke-style anchor.

American Richard Danforth invented the Danforth Anchor in the 1940s for use aboard landing craft. It uses a stock at the crown to which two large flat triangular flukes are attached. The stock is hinged so the flukes can orient toward the bottom (and on some designs may be adjusted for an optimal angle depending on the bottom type). Tripping palms at the crown act to tip the flukes into the seabed. The design is a burying variety, and once well set can develop high resistance. Its lightweight and compact flat design make it easy to retrieve and relatively easy to store; some anchor rollers and hawsepipes can accommodate a fluke-style anchor.

A Danforth does not usually penetrate or hold in gravel or weeds. In boulders and coral it may hold by acting as a hook. If there is much current, or if the vessel is moving while dropping the anchor, it may "kite" or "skate" over the bottom due to the large fluke area acting as a sail or wing.

The FOB HP anchor designed in Brittany in the 1970s is a Danforth variant designed to give increased holding through its use of rounded flukes setting at a 30° angle.

The Fortress is an American aluminum alloy Danforth variant that can be disassembled for storage and it features an adjustable 32° and 45° shank/fluke angle to improve holding capability in common sea bottoms such as hard sand and soft mud. This anchor performed well in a 1989 US Naval Sea Systems Command (NAVSEA) test and in an August 2014 holding power test that was conducted in the soft mud bottoms of the Chesapeake Bay.

=== Bruce or claw anchor ===
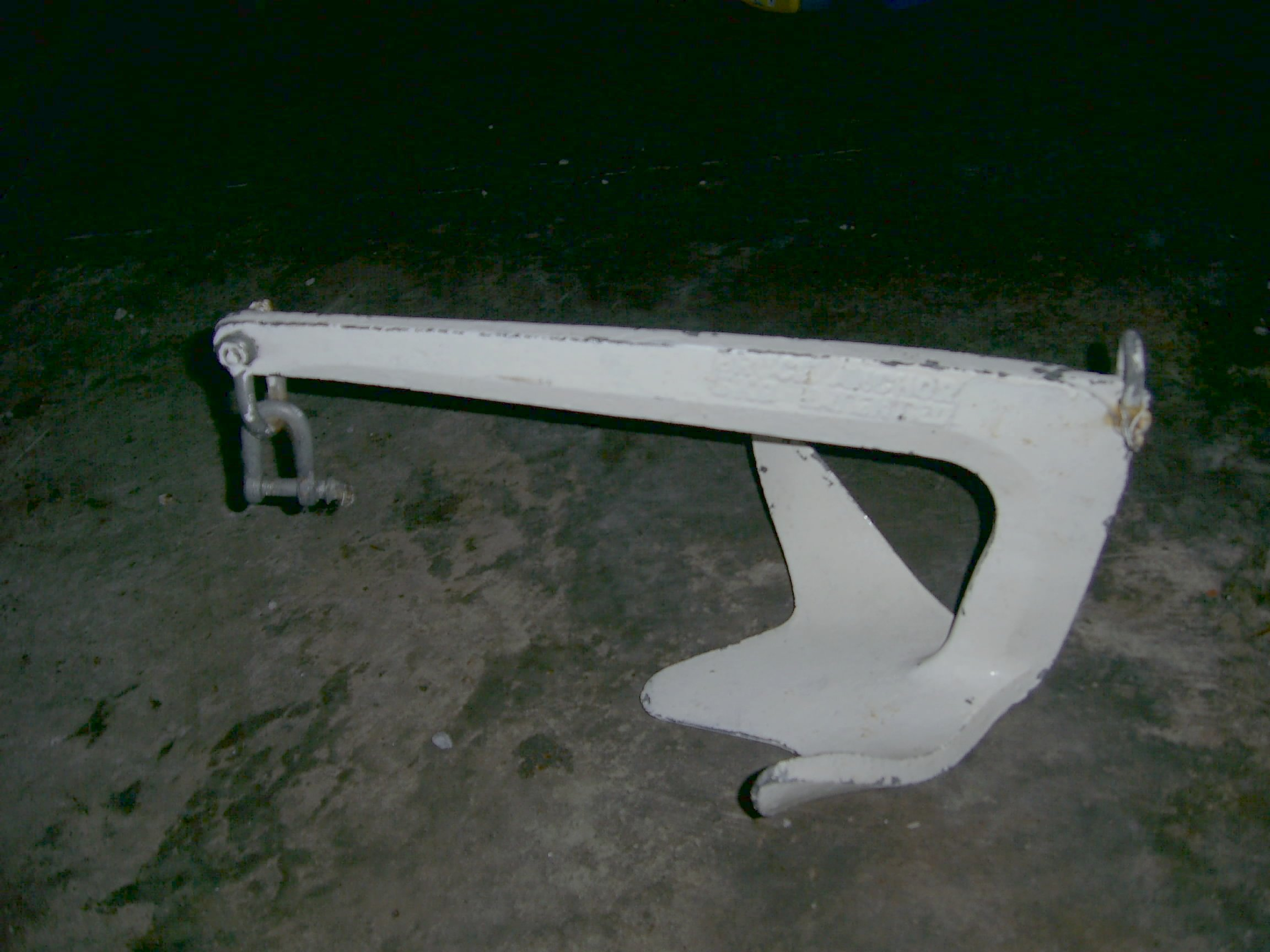
The Bruce anchor was an evolutionary improvement in its day. It is most effective in larger sizes.

This claw-shaped anchor was designed by Peter Bruce from Scotland in the 1970s. Bruce gained his early reputation from the production of large-scale commercial anchors for ships and fixed installations such as oil rigs. It was later scaled down for small boats, and copies of this popular design abound. The Bruce and its copies, known generically as "claw type anchors", have been adopted on smaller boats (partly because they stow easily on a bow roller) but they are most effective in larger sizes. Claw anchors are quite popular on charter fleets as they have a high chance of setting on the first try in many bottoms. They have the reputation of not breaking out with tide or wind changes, instead slowly turning in the bottom to align with the force.

Bruce anchors can have difficulty penetrating weedy bottoms and grass. They offer a fairly low holding-power-to-weight ratio and generally have to be oversized to compete with newer types.

=== Scoop type anchors ===
Three time circumnavigator German Rolf Kaczirek invented the Bügel Anker in the 1980s. Kaczirek wanted an anchor that was self-righting without necessitating a ballasted tip. Instead, he added a roll bar and switched out the plough share for a flat blade design. As none of the innovations of this anchor were patented, copies of it abound.

Alain Poiraud of France introduced the scoop type anchor in 1996. Similar in design to the Bügel anchor, Poiraud's design features a concave fluke shaped like the blade of a shovel, with a shank attached parallel to the fluke, and the load applied toward the digging end. It is designed to dig into the bottom like a shovel, and dig deeper as more pressure is applied. The common challenge with all the scoop type anchors is that they set so well, they can be difficult to weigh.

- Bügelanker, or Wasi: This German-designed bow anchor has a sharp tip for penetrating weed, and features a roll-bar that allows the correct setting attitude to be achieved without the need for extra weight to be inserted into the tip.

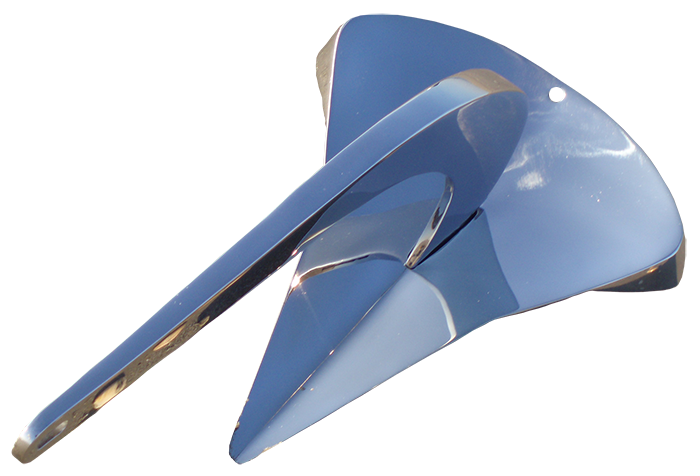
Spade anchor

- Spade: This is a French design that has proven successful since 1996. It features a demountable shank (hollow in some instances) and the choice of galvanized steel, stainless steel, or aluminum construction, which means a lighter and more easily stowable anchor. The geometry also makes this anchor self stowing on a single roller. The Spade anchor is the anchor of choice for Rubicon 3, one of Europe's largest adventure sailing companies

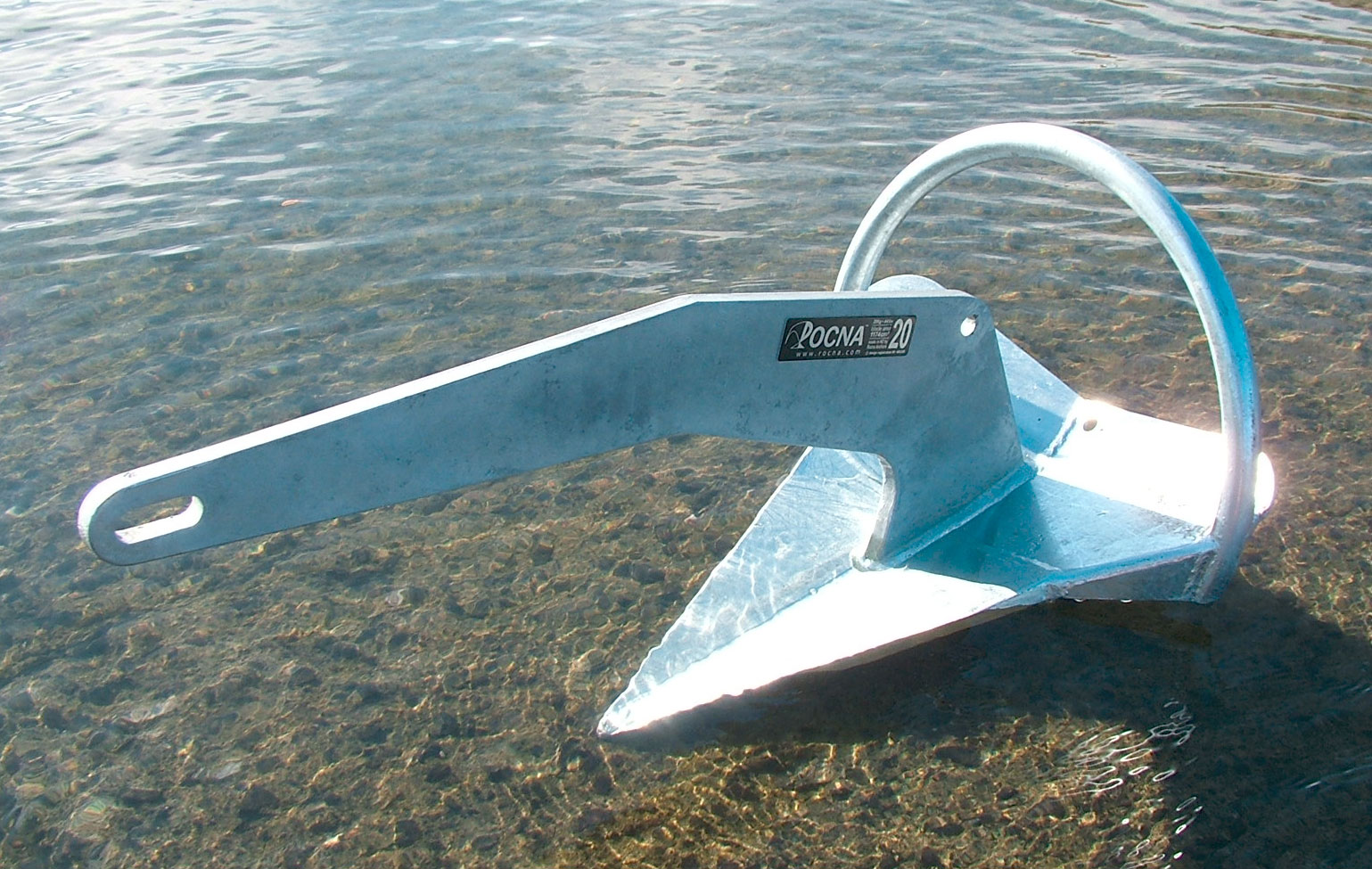
A galvanised Rocna Anchor

- Rocna: This New Zealand spade design, available in galvanised or stainless steel, has been produced since 2004. It has a roll-bar (similar to that of the Bügel), a large spade-like fluke area, and a sharp toe for penetrating weed and grass. The Rocna sets quickly and holds well.

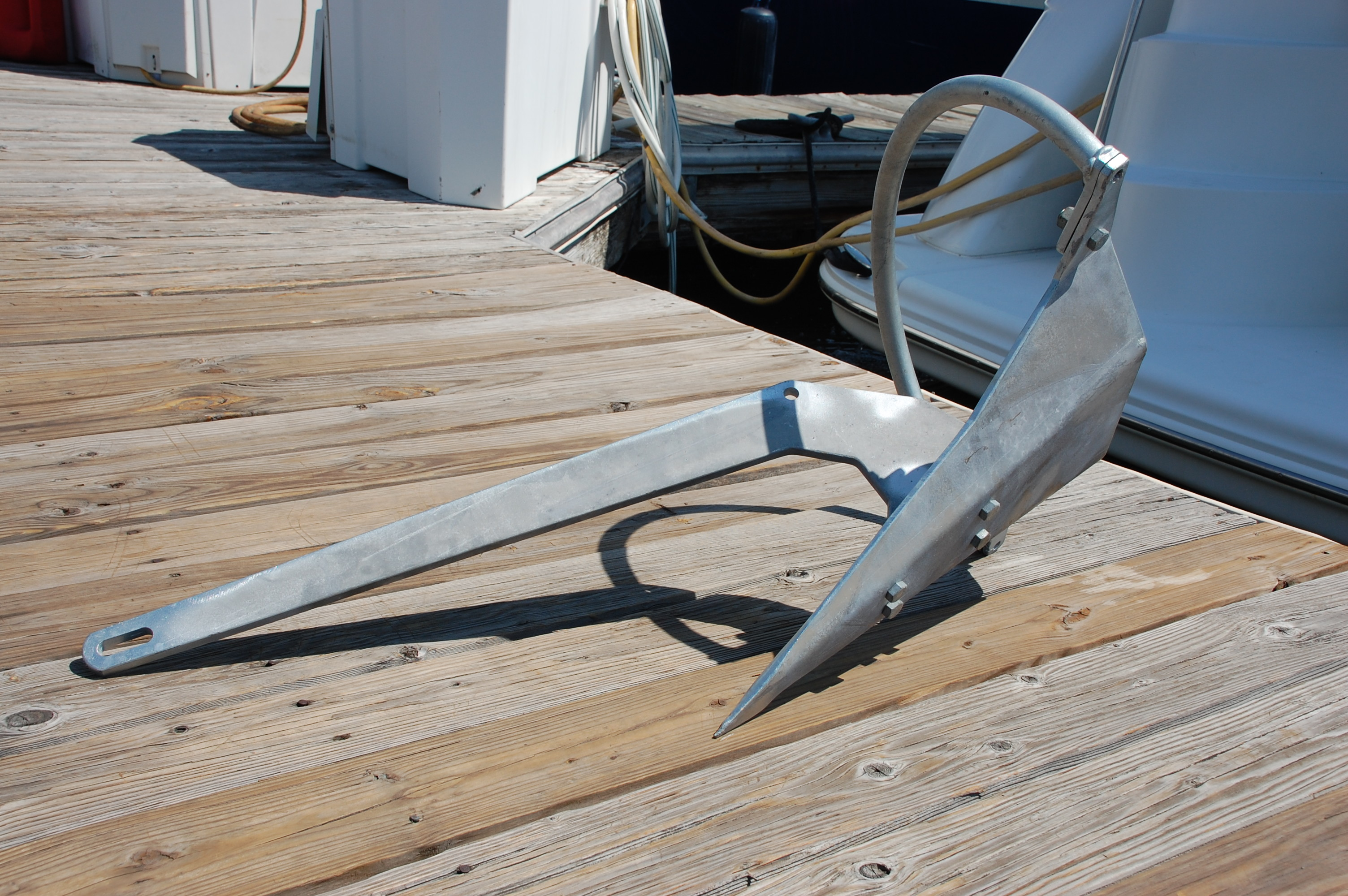
Mantus anchor

- Mantus: This is claimed to be a fast setting anchor with high holding power. It is designed as an all round anchor capable of setting even in challenging bottoms such as hard sand/clay bottoms and grass. The shank is made out of a high tensile steel capable of withstanding high loads. It is similar in design to the Rocna but has a larger and wider roll-bar that reduces the risk of fouling and increases the angle of the fluke that results in improved penetration in some bottoms.
- Ultra: This is an innovative spade design that dispenses with a roll-bar. Made primarily of stainless steel, its main arm is hollow, while the fluke tip has lead within it. It is similar in appearance to the Spade anchor.

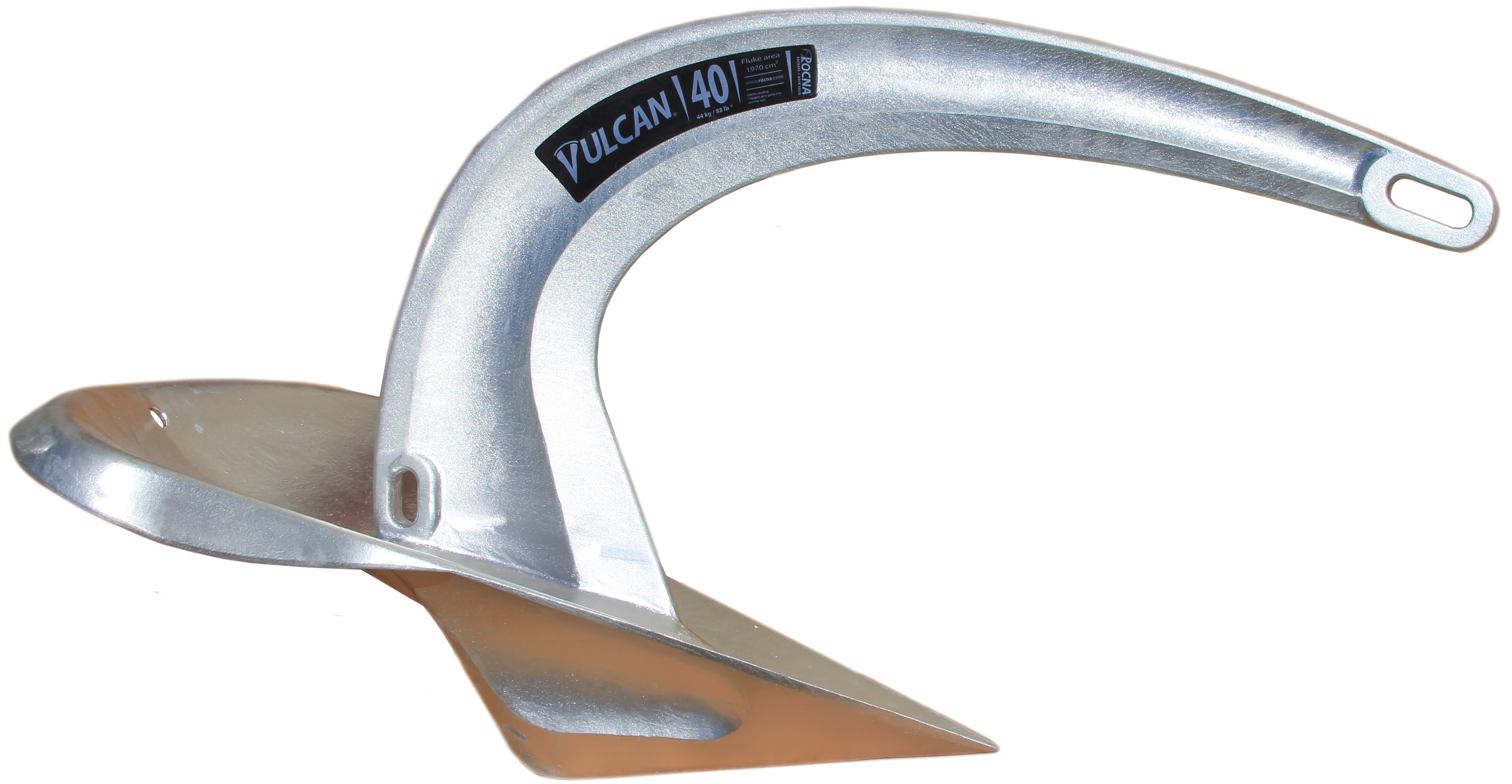
A Vulcan anchor, by Rocna Anchors

- Vulcan: A recent sibling to the Rocna, this anchor performs similarly but does not have a roll-bar. Instead the Vulcan has patented design features such as the "V-bulb" and the "Roll Palm" that allow it to dig in deeply. The Vulcan was designed primarily for sailors who had difficulties accommodating the roll-bar Rocna on their bow. Peter Smith (originator of the Rocna) designed it specifically for larger powerboats. Both Vulcans and Rocnas are available in galvanised steel, or in stainless steel. The Vulcan is similar in appearance to the Spade anchor.

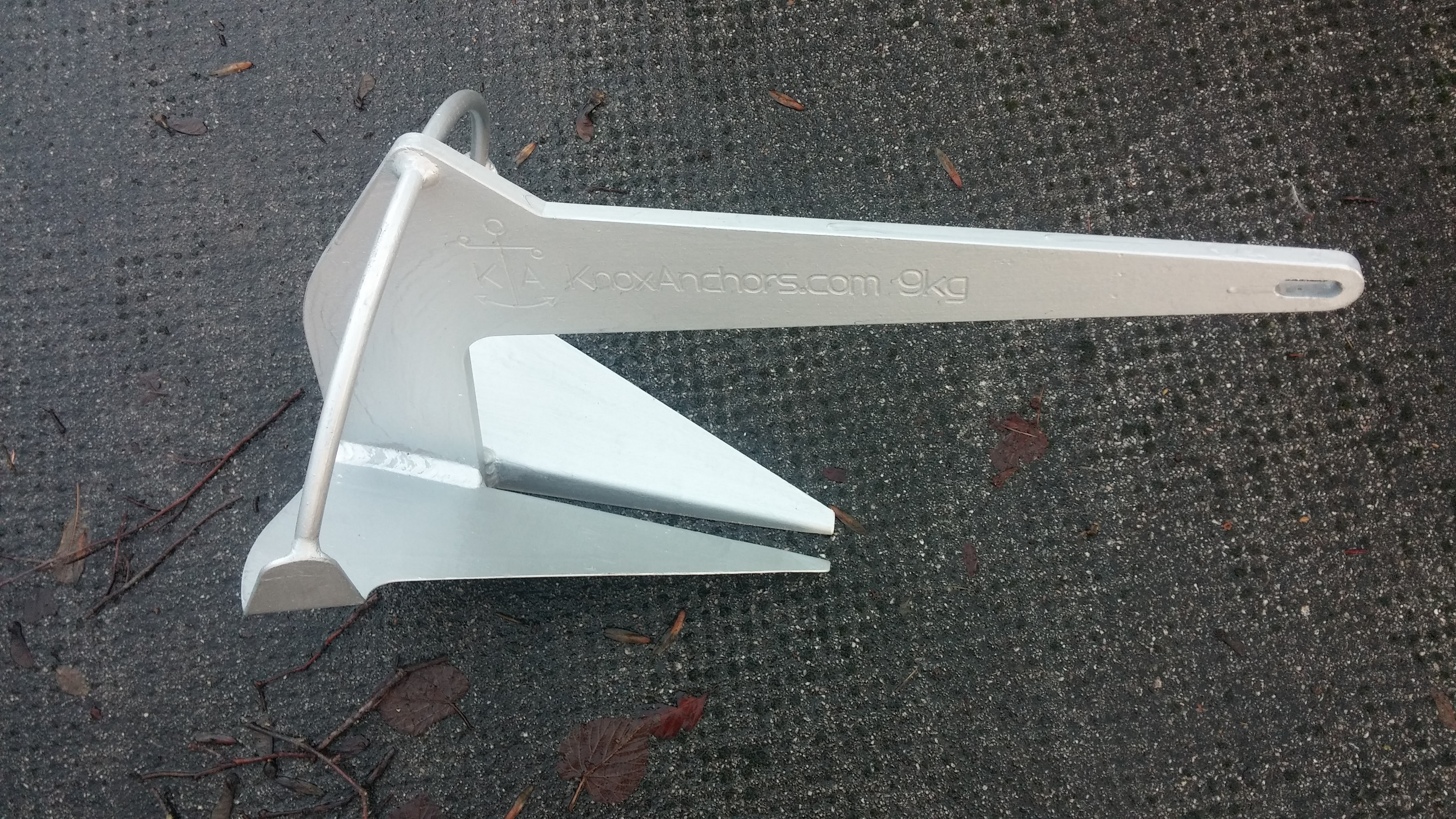
Knox Anchor

- Knox Anchor: These are produced in Scotland and were initially used by Professor John Knox. It has a divided concave shape with a large area in a fluke arrangement and a shank from high tensile steel. A roll bar similar to the Rocna which gives fast setting and a holding power of about 40 times the weight of the anchor.

=== Other temporary anchors ===
- Mud weight: Consists of a blunt heavy weight, usually cast iron or cast lead, that sinks into the mud and resist lateral movement. It is suitable only for soft silt bottoms and in mild conditions. Sizes range between 5 and 20 kg for small craft. Various designs exist and many are home produced from lead or improvised with heavy objects. This is a commonly used method on the Norfolk Broads in England.
- Bulwagga: This is a unique design featuring three flukes instead of the usual two. It has performed well in tests by independent sources such as American boating magazine Practical Sailor.

== Permanent anchors ==
These are used where the vessel is permanently or semi-permanently sited, for example in the case of lightvessels or channel marker buoys. The anchor needs to hold the vessel in all weathers, including the most severe storm, but needs to be lifted only occasionally, at most – for example, only if the vessel is to be towed into port for maintenance. An alternative to using an anchor under these circumstances, especially if the anchor need never be lifted at all, may be to use a pile that is driven into the seabed.

Permanent anchors come in a wide range of types and have no standard form. A slab of rock with an iron staple in it to attach a chain to would serve the purpose, as would any dense object of appropriate weight (for instance, an engine block). Modern moorings may be anchored by augers, which look and act like oversized screws drilled into the seabed, or by barbed metal beams pounded in (or even driven in with explosives) like pilings, or by a variety of other non-mass means of getting a grip on the bottom. One method of building a mooring is to use three or more conventional anchors laid out with short lengths of chain attached to a swivel, so no matter which direction the vessel moves, one or more anchors are aligned to resist the force.

=== Mushroom ===
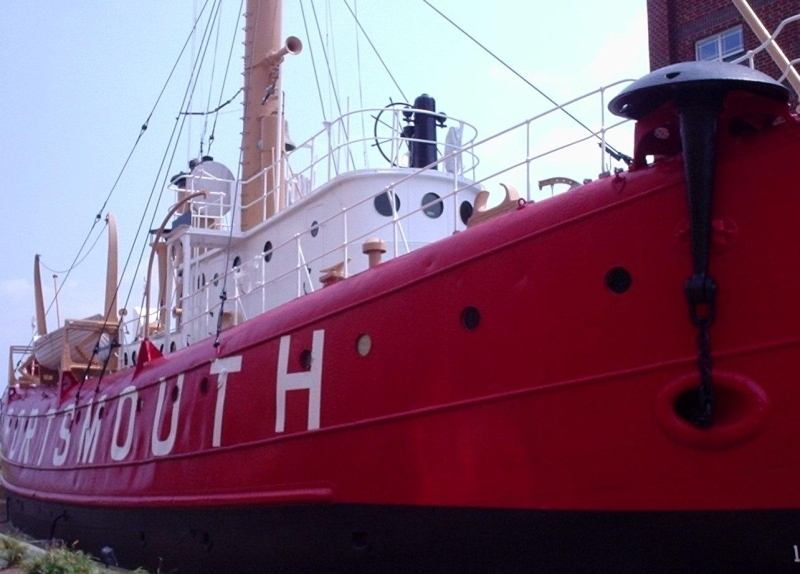
Mushroom anchor (right) on the lightship Portsmouth at Portsmouth, Virginia

The mushroom anchor is suitable where the seabed is composed of silt or fine sand. It was invented by Robert Stevenson, for use by an 82-ton converted fishing boat, Pharos, which was used as a lightvessel between 1807 and 1810 near to Bell Rock whilst the lighthouse was being constructed. It was equipped with a 1.5-ton example.

It is shaped like an inverted mushroom, the head becoming buried in the silt. A counterweight is often provided at the other end of the shank to lay it down before it becomes buried.

A mushroom anchor normally sinks in the silt to the point where it has displaced its own weight in bottom material, thus greatly increasing its holding power. These anchors are suitable only for a silt or mud bottom, since they rely upon suction and cohesion of the bottom material, which rocky or coarse sand bottoms lack. The holding power of this anchor is at best about twice its weight until it becomes buried, when it can be as much as ten times its weight. They are available in sizes from about 5 kg up to several tons.

=== Deadweight ===
A deadweight is an anchor that relies solely on being a heavy weight. It is usually just a large block of concrete or stone at the end of the chain. Its holding power is defined by its weight underwater (i.e., taking its buoyancy into account) regardless of the type of seabed, although suction can increase this if it becomes buried. Consequently, deadweight anchors are used where mushroom anchors are unsuitable, for example in rock, gravel or coarse sand. An advantage of a deadweight anchor over a mushroom is that if it does drag, it continues to provide its original holding force. The disadvantage of using deadweight anchors in conditions where a mushroom anchor could be used is that it needs to be around ten times the weight of the equivalent mushroom anchor.

=== Auger ===
Auger anchors can be used to anchor permanent moorings, floating docks, fish farms, etc. These anchors, which have one or more slightly pitched self-drilling threads, must be screwed into the seabed with the use of a tool, so require access to the bottom, either at low tide or by use of a diver. Hence they can be difficult to install in deep water without special equipment.

Weight for weight, augers have a higher holding than other permanent designs, and so can be cheap and relatively easily installed, although difficult to set in extremely soft mud.

=== High-holding-types ===
There is a need in the oil-and-gas industry to resist large anchoring forces when laying pipelines and for drilling vessels. These anchors are installed and removed using a support tug and pennant/pendant wire. Some examples are the Stevin range supplied by Vrijhof Ankers. Large plate anchors such as the Stevmanta are used for permanent moorings.

== Anchoring gear ==
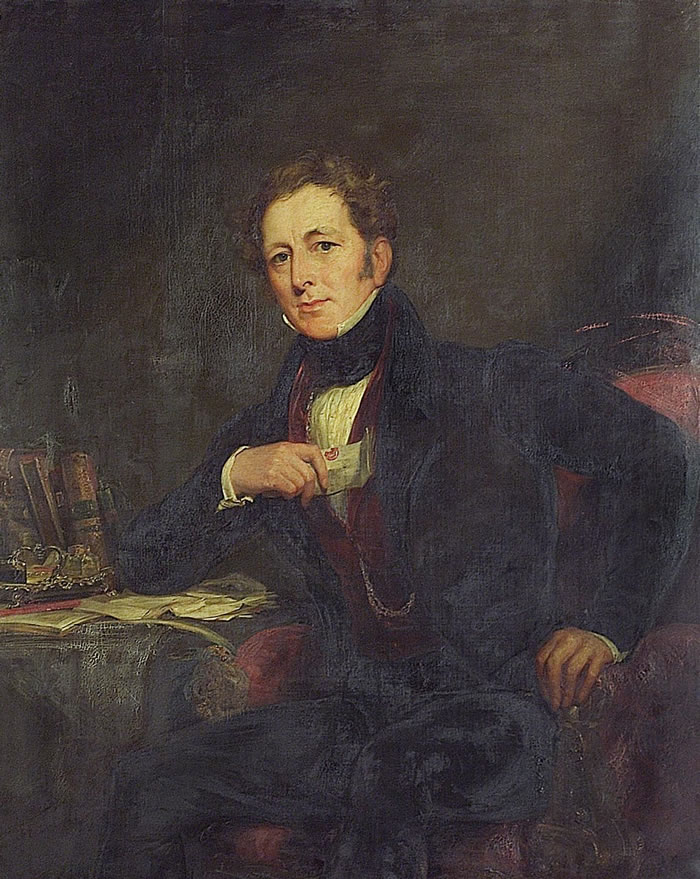
Thomas Brunton invented and patented in 1813 studded-link marine chain cable, which replaced hempen cables and is still in use.

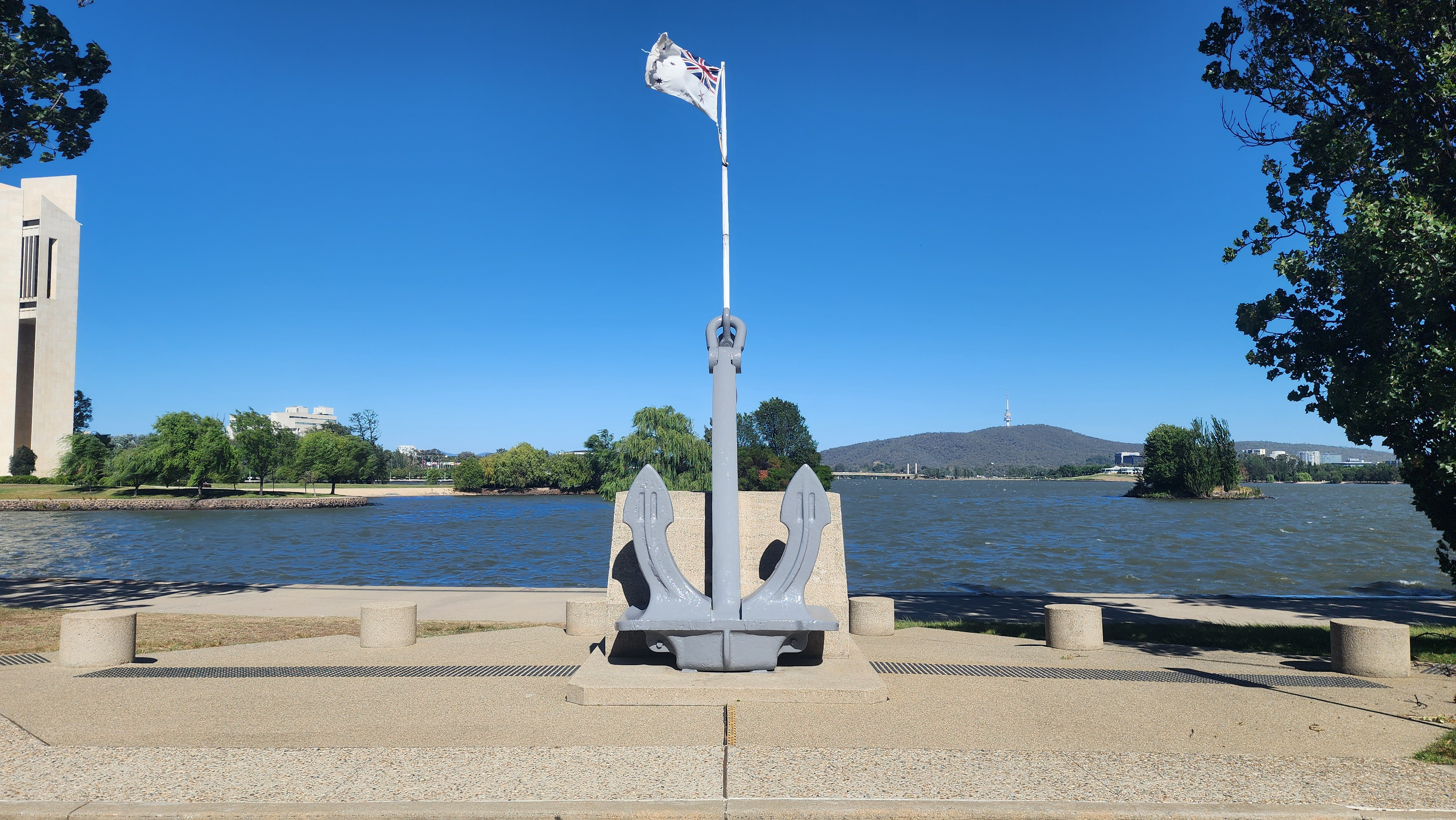
Naval anchor incorporated into HMAS Canberra memorial, Canberra, Australia

The elements of anchoring gear include the anchor, the cable (also called a rode), the method of attaching the two together, the method of attaching the cable to the ship, charts, and a method of learning the depth of the water.

Vessels may carry a number of anchors: bower anchors are the main anchors used by a vessel and normally carried at the bow of the vessel. A kedge anchor is a light anchor used for warping an anchor, also known as kedging, or more commonly on yachts for mooring quickly or in benign conditions. A stream anchor, which is usually heavier than a kedge anchor, can be used for kedging or warping in addition to temporary mooring and restraining stern movement in tidal conditions or in waters where vessel movement needs to be restricted, such as rivers and channels.

=== Anchor rode ===
The anchor rode (or "cable" or "warp") that connects the anchor to the vessel is usually made up of chain, rope, or a combination of those. Large ships use only chain rode. Smaller craft might use a rope/chain combination or an all chain rode. All rodes should have some chain; chain is heavy but it resists abrasion from coral, sharp rocks, or shellfish beds, whereas a rope warp is susceptible to abrasion and can fail in a short time when stretched against an abrasive surface. The weight of the chain also helps keep the direction of pull on the anchor closer to horizontal, which improves holding, and absorbs part of snubbing loads. Where weight is not an issue, a heavier chain provides better holding by forming a catenary curve through the water and resting as much of its length on the bottom as would not be lifted by tension of the mooring load. Any changes to the tension are accommodated by additional chain being lifted or settling on the bottom, and this absorbs shock loads until the chain is straight, at which point the full load is taken by the anchor. Additional dissipation of shock loads can be achieved by fitting a snubber between the chain and a bollard or cleat on deck. This also reduces shock loads on the deck fittings, and the vessel usually lies more comfortably and quietly.

Being strong and elastic, nylon rope is the most suitable as an anchor rode. Polyester (terylene) is stronger but less elastic than nylon. Both materials sink, so they avoid fouling other craft in crowded anchorages and do not absorb much water. Neither breaks down quickly in sunlight. Elasticity helps absorb shock loading, but causes faster abrasive wear when the rope stretches over an abrasive surface, like a coral bottom or a poorly designed chock. Polypropylene ("polyprop") is not suited to rodes because it floats and is much weaker than nylon, being barely stronger than natural fibres. Some grades of polypropylene break down in sunlight and become hard, weak, and unpleasant to handle. Natural fibres such as manila or hemp are still used in developing nations but absorb a lot of water, are relatively weak, and rot, although they do give good handling grip and are often relatively cheap. Ropes that have little or no elasticity are not suitable as anchor rodes. Elasticity is partly a function of the fibre material and partly of the rope structure.

All anchors should have a chain of at least equal to the boat's length. Some skippers prefer an all chain warp for greater security on coral or sharp edged rock bottoms. The chain should be shackled to the warp through a steel eye or spliced to the chain using a chain splice. The shackle pin should be securely wired or moused. Either galvanized or stainless steel is suitable for eyes and shackles, galvanized steel being the stronger of the two. Some skippers prefer to add a swivel to the rode. There is a school of thought that says this swivel should not be connected to the anchor itself, but be somewhere in the chain. However, most skippers connect the swivel directly to the anchor.

==== Scope ====
Scope is the ratio of length of the rode to the depth of the water measured from the highest point (usually the anchor roller or bow chock) to the seabed, making allowance for the highest expected tide. When making this ratio large enough, one can ensure that the pull on the anchor is as horizontal as possible. This will make it unlikely for the anchor to break out of the bottom and drag, if it was properly embedded in the seabed to begin with. When deploying chain, a large enough scope leads to a load that is entirely horizontal, whilst an anchor rode made only of rope will never achieve a strictly horizontal pull.

In moderate conditions, the ratio of rode to water depth should be 4:1 – where there is sufficient swing-room, a greater scope is always better. In rougher conditions it should be up to twice this with the extra length giving more stretch and a smaller angle to the bottom to resist the anchor breaking out. For example, if the water is 8 metres (26 ft) deep, and the anchor roller is 1 m (3 ft) above the water, then the 'depth' is 9 meters (~30 feet). The amount of rode to let out in moderate conditions is thus 36 meters (120 feet). (For this reason, it is important to have a reliable and accurate method of measuring the depth of water.)

When using a rope rode, there is a simple way to estimate the scope: The ratio of bow height of the rode to length of rode above the water while lying back hard on the anchor is the same or less than the scope ratio. The basis for this is simple geometry (Intercept Theorem): The ratio between two sides of a triangle stays the same regardless of the size of the triangle as long as the angles do not change.

Generally, the rode should be between 5 and 10 times the depth to the seabed, giving a scope of 5:1 or 10:1; the larger the number, the shallower the angle is between the cable and the seafloor, and the less upwards force is acting on the anchor. A 10:1 scope gives the greatest holding power, but also allows for much more drifting about due to the longer amount of cable paid out. Anchoring with sufficient scope and/or heavy chain rode brings the direction of strain close to parallel with the seabed. This is particularly important for light, modern anchors designed to bury in the bottom, where scopes of 5:1 to 7:1 are common, whereas heavy anchors and moorings can use a scope of 3:1, or less. Some modern anchors, such as the Ultra holds with a scope of 3:1; but, unless the anchorage is crowded, a longer scope always reduces shock stresses.

A major disadvantage of the concept of scope is that it does not take into account the fact that a chain is forming a catenary when hanging between two points (i.e., bow roller and the point where the chain hits the seabed), and thus is a non-linear curve (in fact, a cosh() function), whereas scope is a linear function. As a consequence, in deep water the scope needed will be less, whilst in very shallow water the scope must be chosen much larger to achieve the same pulling angle at the anchor shank. For this reason, the British Admiralty does not use a linear scope formula, but a square root formula instead.

A couple of online calculators exist to work out the amount of chain and rope needed to achieve a (possibly nearly) horizontal pull at the anchor shank, and the associated anchor load.

== Security and modes of failure ==
Common modes of failure for anchoring are dragging the anchor, in which the anchor fails to hold against the load, parting of the cable, in which the rode either fails under the tensile load or abrades until it is so weakened as to fail under a lesser load, and fouling of the anchor, in which the anchor is prevented from setting correctly.

Consequences of failure depend on circumstances, but may include wrecking by being driven aground on a lee shore, a particularly serious risk for sailing vessels without auxiliary propulsion when embayed.

=== Holding ground ===
Effects of bottom composition on holding power

=== Material of cable ===
Rope vs chain cable. Functions of elasticity and weight.

== As symbol ==
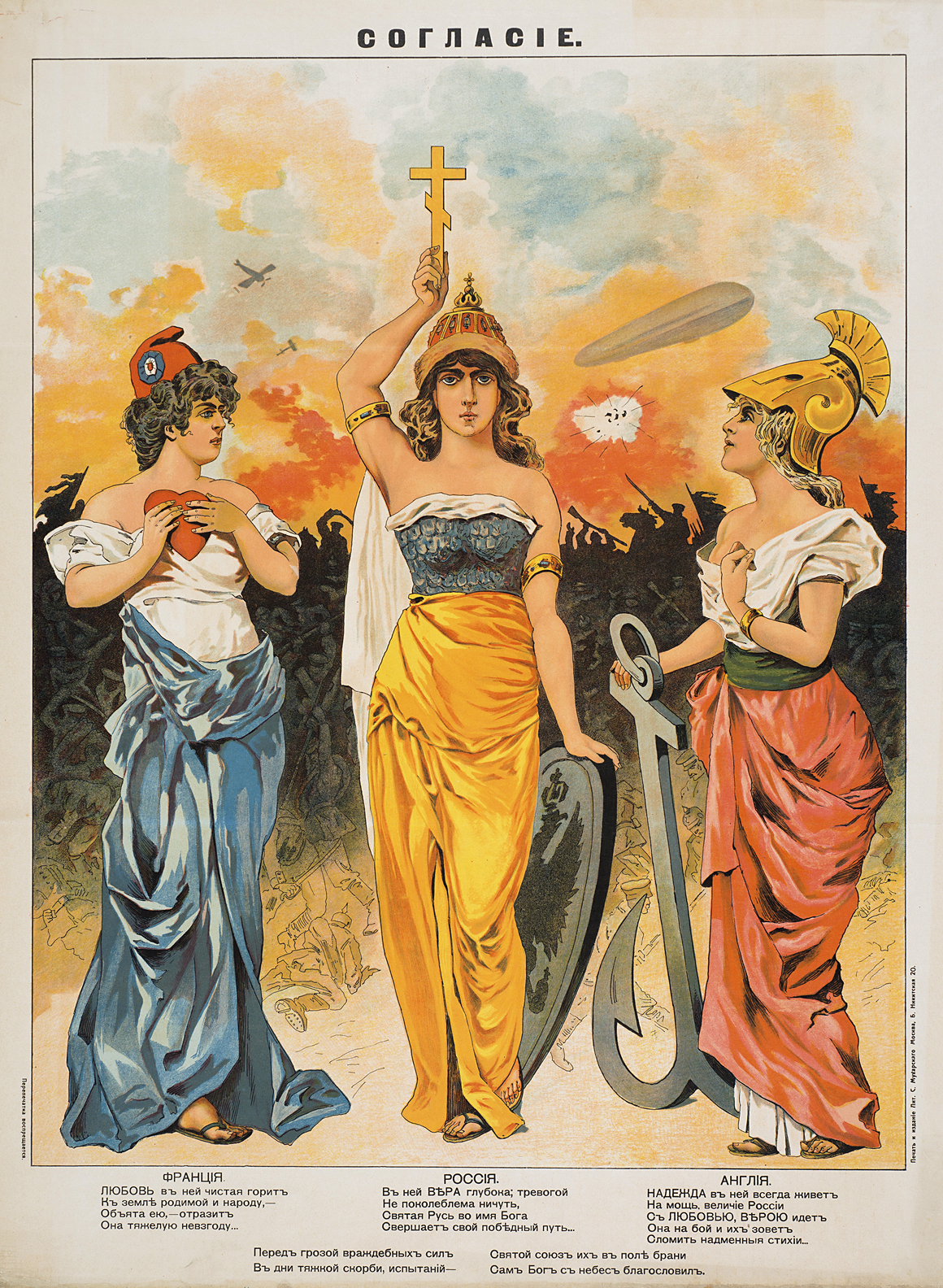
A 1914 Russian poster depicting the Triple Entente of World War I, with Britannia's association with the sea symbolized by her holding a large anchor

An anchor pictured in the coat of arms of Mariehamn, the capital city of Åland

An anchor frequently appears on the flags and coats of arms of institutions involved with the sea, as well as of port cities and seacoast regions and provinces in various countries. There also exists in heraldry the "Anchored Cross", or Mariner's Cross, a stylized cross in the shape of an anchor. The symbol can be used to signify 'fresh start' or 'hope'.

The Mariner's Cross is also referred to as St. Clement's Cross, in reference to the way this saint was killed (being tied to an anchor and thrown from a boat into the Black Sea in 102). Anchored crosses are occasionally a feature of coats of arms in which context they are referred to by the heraldic terms anchry or ancre. The Unicode anchor (Miscellaneous Symbols) is represented by: U+2693 ⚓ ANCHOR.

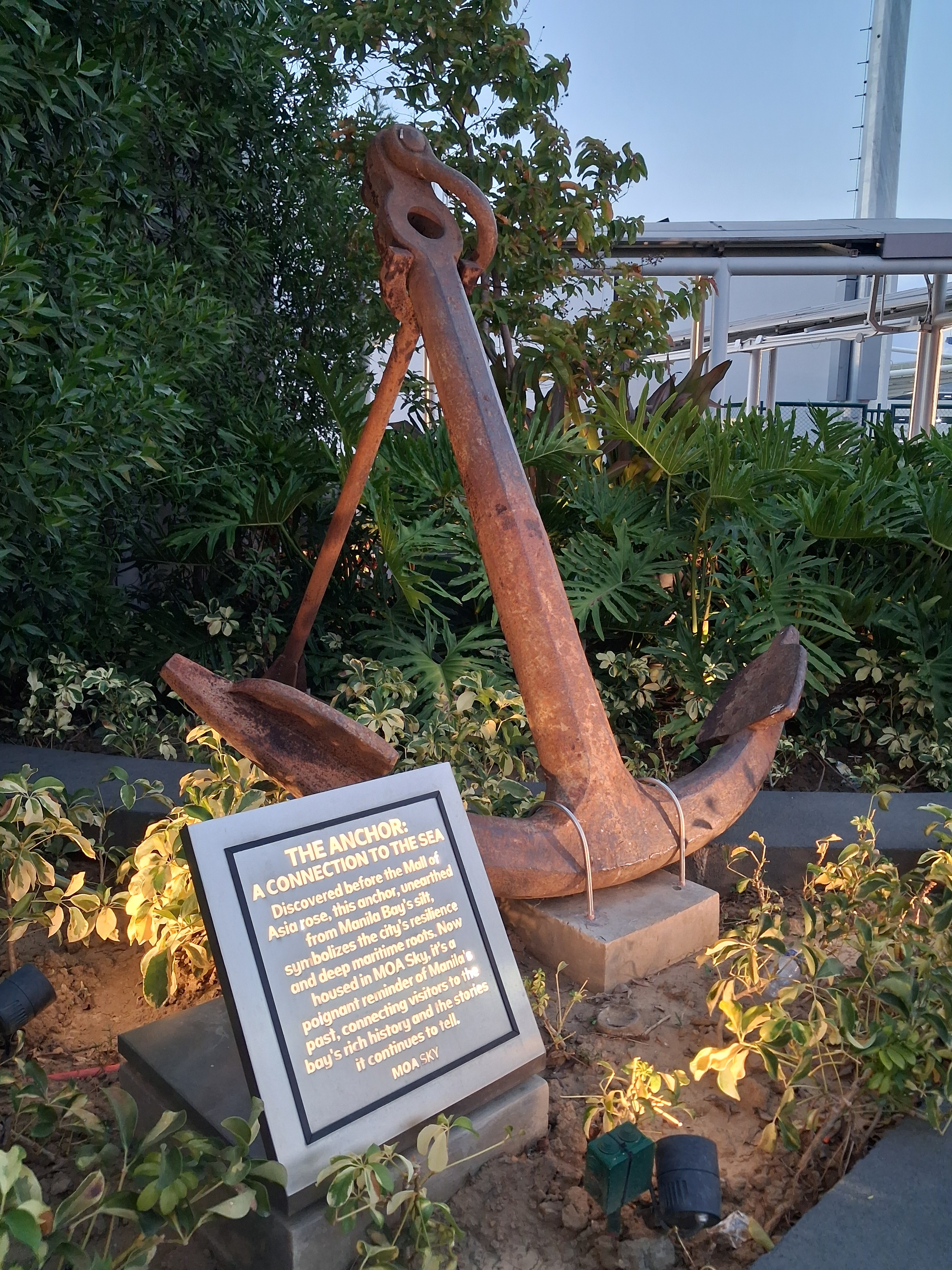
Old anchor in Manila

== See also ==
- Anchor coinage – Coins for British colonies in 1820/1822
- Digital anchor – Position holding by dynamic positioning systems
- Fouled anchor – Entangled anchor, usually in its cable
- Offshore embedded anchors – Type of marine mooring component
- Sea anchor – Drag device used to stabilize a boat in heavy weather and reduce drift
- "Anchors Aweigh", United States Navy marching song
- Anchorage (maritime)

== Bibliography ==
- Blackwell, Alex & Daria; Happy Hooking – the Art of Anchoring, 2008, 2011, 2019 White Seahorse; ISBN 978-1795717410
- Edwards, Fred; Sailing as a Second Language: An illustrated dictionary, 1988 Highmark Publishing; ISBN 0-87742-965-0
- Hinz, Earl R.; The Complete Book of Anchoring and Mooring, Rev. 2d ed., 1986, 1994, 2001 Cornell Maritime Press; ISBN 0-87033-539-1
- Hiscock, Eric C.; Cruising Under Sail, second edition, 1965 Oxford University Press; ISBN 0-19-217522-X
- Pardey, Lin and Larry; The Capable Cruiser; 1995 Pardey Books/Paradise Cay Publications; ISBN 0-9646036-2-4
- Rousmaniere, John; The Annapolis Book of Seamanship, 1983, 1989 Simon and Schuster; ISBN 0-671-67447-1
- Smith, Everrett; Cruising World's Guide to Seamanship: Hold me tight, 1992 New York Times Sports/Leisure Magazines
