= Stockless anchor =

Type of anchor

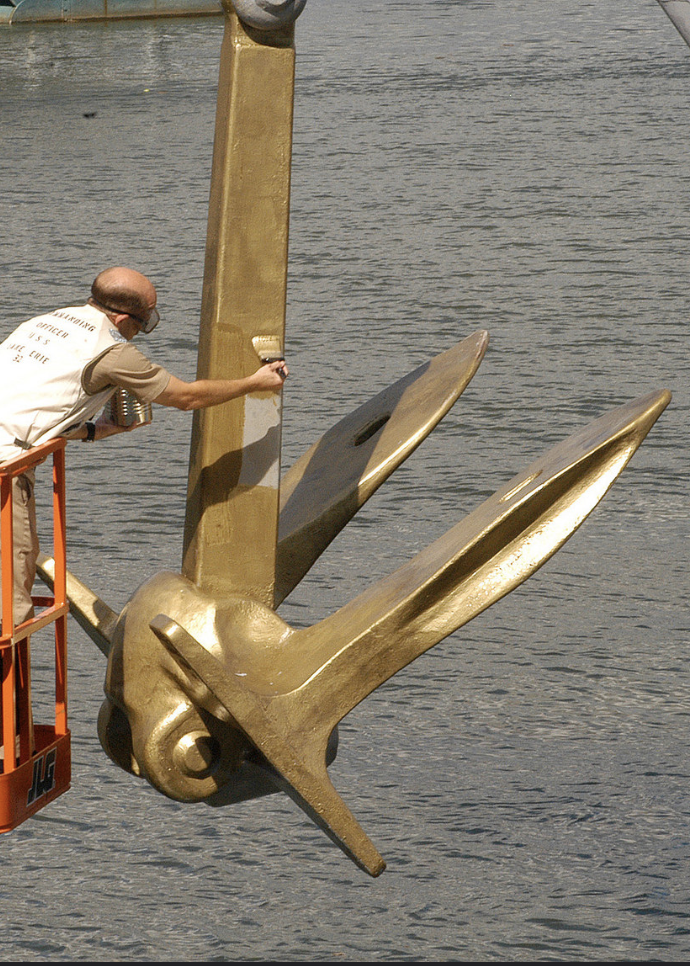
Standard US Navy Stockless anchor aboard USS Lake Erie (CG-70)

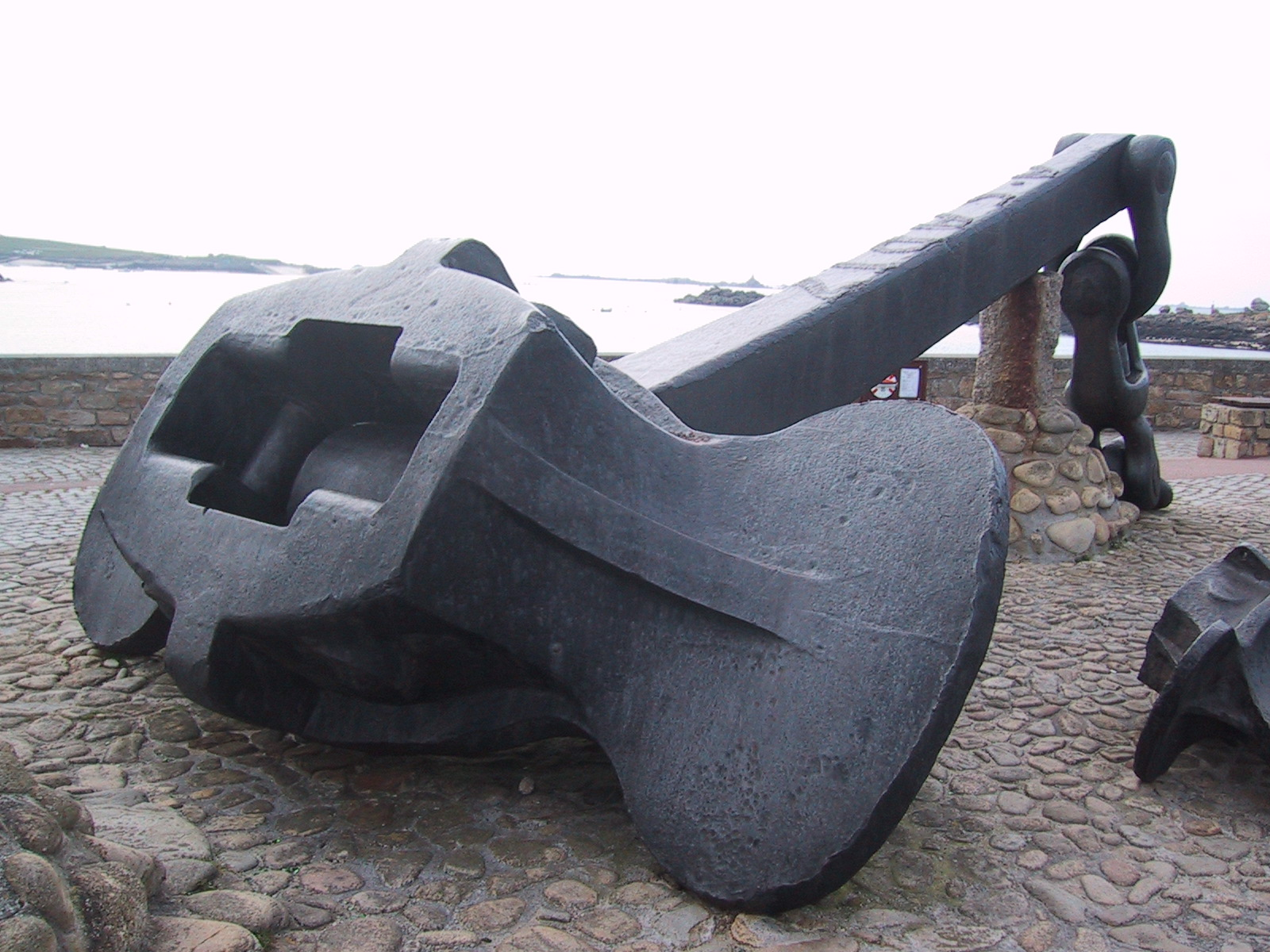
Stockless anchor of the Amoco Cadiz in Portsall, north-west Brittany, France

A stockless anchor (or "patent anchor") is a streamlined derivation of the traditional Admiralty anchor used aboard large ships. Patented in England in 1821, it eliminated the stock (crossbar) of the Admiralty-type, making it both easier to handle and stow. Though it did not hold as well as an Admiralty, the trade-off proved acceptable and the stockless anchor became widely popular, and it remains so.

== Design ==
The stockless anchor is an improved version of the Admiralty anchor it is derived from. It has two flukes that pivot on the same plane perpendicular to the shank. The weight of the shank and accompanying chain, or the shank angled under tension, keep the anchor laying flat on the sea floor.

== Performance ==
The stockless anchor is a simple design with no unnecessary parts. This makes it comparatively easy to handle and store. The simple geometry of its design makes breaking it from the bottom a relatively easy and reliable procedure. The shank being able to pivot while the flukes are embedded in the sea floor minimizes wear on attachment hardware. Another advantage of the pivoting shank design is that the anchor generally will still hold even if the wind and or current changes direction and causes the vessel to pull on the anchor from a slightly different angle. Due to the simple design of the stockless anchor, it is capable of free falling much faster in water than other more bulky anchor types according to a study done by The Japan Institute of Navigation.

In terms of disadvantages, the stockless anchor is shown to perform poorly in soft cohesive bottoms such as soil or sand compared to other anchor types made specifically for that type of bottom. Also, the Navy Stockless Anchor has an efficiency rate of 4–6, compared to other types of anchors with efficiency rates ranging from 15 to 55.

== Action ==
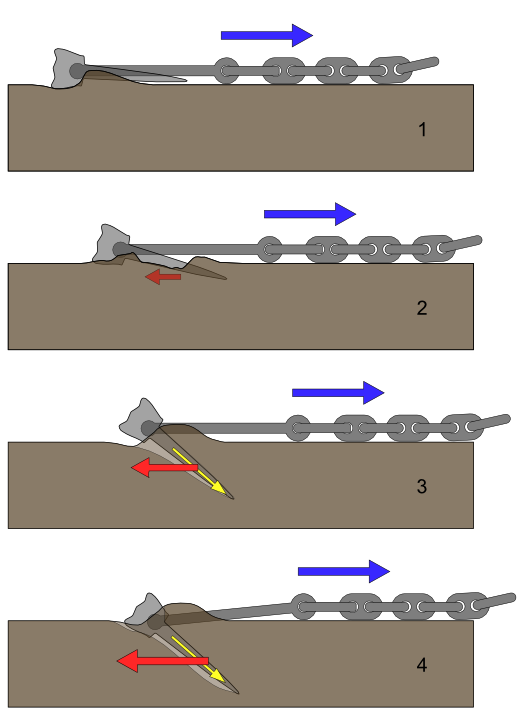
A stockless anchor being set

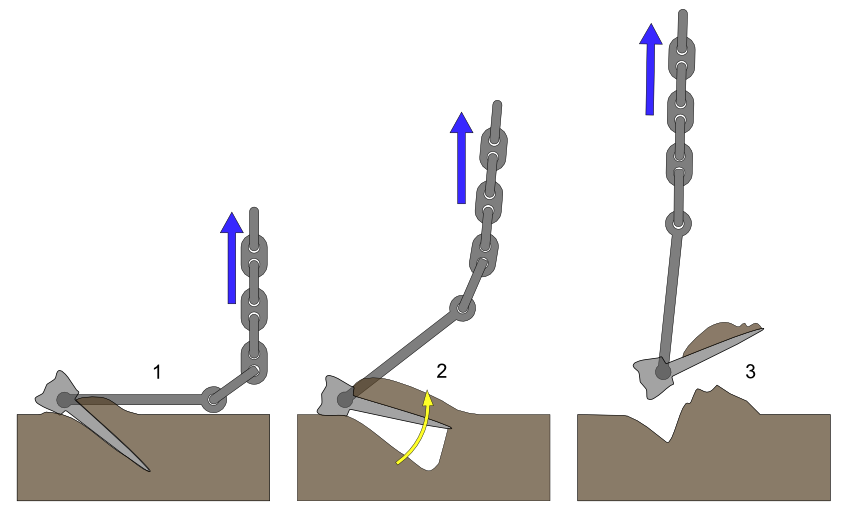
A stockless anchor being broken out
