= Recruiting Act 1779 =

Act of the Parliament of Great Britain

- Act of Parliament
- Parliament of Great Britain
- Long title: An Act for repealing an act, made in the last session of parliament, intituled, An Act for the more easy and better recruiting of his Majesty's land forces and marines; and for substituting other and more effectual provisions in the place thereof.
- Citation: 19 Geo. 3. c. 10
- Territorial extent: Great Britain

Dates
- Royal assent: 9 February 1779
- Commencement: 26 November 1778 (Note: Start of session.)
- Repealed: 21 August 1871

Other legislation
- Repeals/revokes: Recruiting Act 1778
- Repealed by: Statute Law Revision Act 1871
- Relates to: Recruiting Act 1703

Status: Repealed

Text of statute as originally enacted

The Recruiting Act 1779 (19 Geo. 3. c. 10) was an act of the Parliament of Great Britain. It was a press Act for the recruiting of his Majesty's Land Forces. After the losses in the American Revolutionary War and the apprehended hostilities with France, the existing voluntary enlistment measures were judged to be insufficient. It served as a revision of the Recruiting Act 1778 (18 Geo. 3. c. 53).

It raised the bounty £3, 3s. After the expiration of their service, volunteers were exempt from the performance of statue (highway) duty, for service as parish officers, and from service in the army, navy, or militia. They were allowed to set up and exercise any trade in any place in Great Britain.

It enlarged those subject to impressment beyond smugglers and "all able-bodied and disorderly persons" to include those "convicted of running away from and leaving their families chargeable upon the parish". The chief advantage of this Act was in the number of volunteers brought in under the apprehension of impressment.

== Subsequent developments ==
The act received royal assent on 9 February 1779. On 26 May 1780 it was repealed with the exception of the parts relating to volunteers.

The whole act was repealed by section 1 of, and the schedule to, the Statute Law Revision Act 1871 (34 & 35 Vict. c. 116), which came into force on 21 August 1871.

== Bibliography ==
- Curtis, Edward, The Organization of the British Army in the American Revolution. 1972, ISBN 0-85409-906-9
