= Recruiting Act 1703 =

Act of the Parliament of England

- Act of Parliament
- Parliament of England
- Long title: An Act for raising Recruits for the Land Forces and Marines and for dispensing with Part of the Act for the Incouragement and Increase of Shipping and Navigation during the present Warr.
- Citation: 2 & 3 Ann. c. 13 (Note: This is the citation in The Statutes of the Realm.); 2 & 3 Ann. c. 19 (Note: This is the citation in The Statutes at Large.)
- Territorial extent: England and Wales

Dates
- Royal assent: 3 April 1704
- Commencement: 9 November 1703 (Note: Start of session.)
- Repealed: 15 July 1867
Other legislation
Amends	Navigation Act 1660r
Repealed by	Statute Law Revision Act 1867
Relates to	Maintenance of the Navy Act 1562; Vagabonds (No. 2) Act 1597; Recruiting Act 1778; Recruiting Act 1779

Status: Repealed

Text of statute as originally enacted

The Recruiting Act 1703 (2 & 3 Ann. c. 13) was an act of the Parliament of England, after the start of the War of the Spanish Succession in Europe, with Queen Anne's War in America. It was long titled An Act for raising Recruits for the Land Forces, and Marines, and for dispensing with Part of the Act for the Encouragement and Increase of Shipping and Navigation, during the present War. With the pressures of war, the act provided for the forcible enlistment of able bodied men into the army and navy who did not have visible means of subsistence. It also established administration and regulations under the act within local jurisdictions and became effective for one year from 1 March 1703.

Section eight of the act relaxed the normal crewing requirements for merchant ships under the Navigation Acts, which mandates that three quarters of the crew be English subjects. This act allowed up to half the crew to be foreigners during the war. It was intended to make experienced English seamen more available to serve on ships of war.

== Subsequent developments ==
The whole act was repealed by section 1 of, and the schedule to, the Statute Law Revision Act 1867 (30 & 31 Vict. c. 59), which came into force on 15 July 1867.
