= Taxation of Colonies Act 1778 =

Act of the Parliament of Great Britain

Taxation of Colonies Act 1778 (Note: The citation of this act by this short title was authorised by section 1 of, and the first schedule to, the Short Titles Act 1896. Due to the repeal of those provisions it is now authorised by section 19(2) of the Interpretation Act 1978.)
- Act of Parliament
- Parliament of Great Britain
- Long title: An Act for removing all Doubts and Apprehensions concerning Taxation by the Parliament of Great Britain in any of the Colonies, Provinces, and Plantations in North America and the West Indies; and for repealing so much of an Act made in the Seventh Year of the Reign of His late Majesty as imposes a Duty on Tea imported from Great Britain into any Colony or Plantation in America as relates to there.
- Citation: 18 Geo. 3. c. 12
- Territorial extent: [[Great Britain]]; British America and the British West Indies

Dates
- Royal assent: 11 March 1778
- Commencement: 11 March 1778 (Note: Section 1.)
- Repealed: 18 July 1973
Other legislation
Amends	Duties on Tea, etc. (American Plantations) Act 1766
Amended by	Statute Law Revision Act 1871; Statute Law Revision Act 1887
Repealed by	Statute Law (Repeals) Act 1973
Relates to	Customs Act 1772; Customs Act 1826

Status: Repealed

Text of statute as originally enacted

The Taxation of Colonies Act 1778 (18 Geo. 3. c. 12) was an act of the Parliament of Great Britain that declared Parliament would not impose any duty, tax, or assessment for the raising of revenue in any of the colonies of British America or the British West Indies. The act, passed during the American Revolutionary War, was an attempt by Parliament to end the war by conceding one of the early points of dispute.

Parliament's effort to tax the colonies without the consent of the colonists, especially as enacted in the Townshend Acts of 1767 and the Tea Act of 1773, had been a major cause of the American Revolution. This act noted that those taxes had "been found by experience to occasion great uneasiness and disorders" and that his Majesty desired "to restore the peace and welfare of all his Majesty's Dominions".

The act declared that Parliament would not impose any duty, tax, or assessment for the raising of revenue in any of the colonies. Parliament would only impose such duties as expedient to regulate commerce and the net income from these duties would be given to the colonies. In making this concession, Parliament was taking the position that American colonists had advocated a decade earlier, most notably John Dickinson in his 1767 and 1768 "Letters from a Farmer in Pennsylvania".

By the time the statute was enacted, it was too late to have any effect on the war: the dispute had expanded beyond taxation, and the colonies had already declared independence. Additionally, according to legal historian John Phillip Reid, "As a matter of constitutional law the statute was meaningless", because future parliaments would not be bound by the current parliament's pledge not to impose taxes.

== Subsequent developments ==
Section 2 of the act was repealed by section 1 of, and the schedule to, the Statute Law Revision Act 1871 (34 & 35 Vict. c. 116), which came into force on 21 August 1871.

The whole act was repealed by section 1(1) of, and part VII of schedule 1 to, the Statute Law (Repeals) Act 1973, which came into force on 18 July 1973.
