= Recruiting Act 1778 =

Act of the Parliament of Great Britain

- Act of Parliament
- Parliament of Great Britain
- Long title: An Act for the more easy and better recruiting of his Majesty's land forces and marines.
- Citation: 18 Geo. 3. c. 53
- Territorial extent: Great Britain

Dates
- Royal assent: 28 May 1778
- Commencement: 20 November 1777 (Note: Start of session.)
- Repealed: 26 November 1778
Other legislation
Repealed by	Recruiting Act 1779
Relates to	Recruiting Act 1703

Status: Repealed

Text of statute as originally enacted

The Recruiting Act 1778 (18 Geo. 3. c. 53) was an act of the Parliament of Great Britain, which created a bounty system for volunteers and instituted impressment to recruit more soldiers for the Army and Royal Marines. The act received royal assent on 28 May 1778.

== Background ==
After the losses at the Battle of Saratoga in the American Revolutionary War and the apprehended hostilities with France, the existing voluntary enlistment measures were judged to be insufficient.

== Provisions ==
It provided that each volunteer receive a bounty of £3, and that he should be entitled to discharge after three years unless the nation were at war.

It also empowered the justices of the peace to levy and deliver to the recruiting officers "all able-bodied idle, and disorderly persons, who could not upon examination prove themselves to exercise and industrially follow some lawful trade or employment, or to have some substance sufficient for their support and maintenance". A reward of 10s. was offered to the discoverer of any person liable within the provisions of the Act. Impressed men could demand discharge after five years, unless the nation were at war.

Geographically its operation was confined, by the direction of the Secretary for War, to Scotland and to "the City of London, the city and liberties of Westminster, and such parts of the County of Middlesex as are within the Bills of Mortality". The chief advantage of the act was in the number of volunteers brought in under the apprehension of impressment.

== Subseqeunt developments ==
The whole act was repealed by section 1 of the Recruiting Act 1779 (19 Geo. 3. c. 10), which came into force on 26 November 1778. The 1779 act replaced this act.

== See also ==
- Recruiting Act 1703

== Bibliography ==
- Curtis, Edward (1972). The Organization of the British Army in the American Revolution. EP. ISBN 0854099069.
