= List of acts of the Parliament of Great Britain from 1778 =

This is a complete list of acts of the Parliament of Great Britain for the year 1778.

For acts passed until 1707, see the list of acts of the Parliament of England and the list of acts of the Parliament of Scotland. See also the list of acts of the Parliament of Ireland.

For acts passed from 1801 onwards, see the list of acts of the Parliament of the United Kingdom. For acts of the devolved parliaments and assemblies in the United Kingdom, see the list of acts of the Scottish Parliament, the list of acts of the Northern Ireland Assembly, and the list of acts and measures of Senedd Cymru; see also the list of acts of the Parliament of Northern Ireland.

The number shown after each act's title is its chapter number. Acts are cited using this number, preceded by the year(s) of the reign during which the relevant parliamentary session was held; thus the Union with Ireland Act 1800 is cited as "39 & 40 Geo. 3. c. 67", meaning the 67th act passed during the session that started in the 39th year of the reign of George III and which finished in the 40th year of that reign. Note that the modern convention is to use Arabic numerals in citations (thus "41 Geo. 3" rather than "41 Geo. III"). Acts of the last session of the Parliament of Great Britain and the first session of the Parliament of the United Kingdom are both cited as "41 Geo. 3".

Acts passed by the Parliament of Great Britain did not have a short title; however, some of these acts have subsequently been given a short title by acts of the Parliament of the United Kingdom (such as the Short Titles Act 1896).

Before the Acts of Parliament (Commencement) Act 1793 came into force on 8 April 1793, acts passed by the Parliament of Great Britain were deemed to have come into effect on the first day of the session in which they were passed. Because of this, the years given in the list below may in fact be the year before a particular act was passed.

== 18 Geo. 3 ==
The fourth session of the 14th Parliament of Great Britain, which met from 20 November 1777 until 3 June 1778.

This session was also traditionally cited as 18 G. 3.

=== Public acts ===
Short title	Citation	Royal assent
Long title
Habeas Corpus Suspension Act 1778 (repealed)	18 Geo. 3. c. 1	10 December 1777
An Act for continuing an Act made in the last Session of Parliament, intituled, "An Act to empower His Majesty to secure and detain Persons charged with or suspected of the Crime of High Treason, committed in any of His Majesty's Colonies or Plantations in America, or on the High Seas, or the Crime of Piracy." (Repealed by Statute Law Revision Act 1871 (34 & 35 Vict. c. 116))
Land Tax Act 1778 (repealed)	18 Geo. 3. c. 2	10 December 1777
An Act for granting an Aid to His Majesty by a Land Tax, to be raised in Great Britain, for the Service of the Year One thousand seven hundred and seventy-eight. (Repealed by Statute Law Revision Act 1871 (34 & 35 Vict. c. 116))
Malt Duties Act 1778 (repealed)	18 Geo. 3. c. 3	10 December 1777
An Act for continuing and granting to His Majesty, certain Duties upon Malt, Mum, Cyder, and Perry, for the Service of the Year One thousand seven hundred and seventy-eight. (Repealed by Statute Law Revision Act 1871 (34 & 35 Vict. c. 116))
Mutiny Act 1778 (repealed)	18 Geo. 3. c. 4	11 March 1778
An Act for punishing Mutiny and Desertion, and for the better Payment of the Army and their Quarters. (Repealed by Statute Law Revision Act 1871 (34 & 35 Vict. c. 116))
Marine Mutiny Act 1778 (repealed)	18 Geo. 3. c. 5	6 March 1778
An Act for the Regulation of His Majesty's Marine Forces while on Shore. (Repealed by Statute Law Revision Act 1871 (34 & 35 Vict. c. 116))
Navigation Act 1778 (repealed)	18 Geo. 3. c. 6	6 March 1778
An Act for the better Supply of Mariners and Seamen to serve in His Majesty's Ships of War, and on board Merchant Ships, and other Trading Ships and Vessels. (Repealed by Statute Law Revision Act 1871 (34 & 35 Vict. c. 116))
Wigtown Roads Act 1778 (repealed)	18 Geo. 3. c. 7	6 March 1778
An Act for repairing the Highways and Bridges in the County of Wigton. (Repealed by Highways and Bridges in Wigtownshire Act 1802 (42 Geo. 3. c. lv))
Bristol Theatre Act 1778 (repealed)	18 Geo. 3. c. 8	6 March 1778
An Act to enable His Majesty to License a Theatre in the City of Bristol. (Repealed by Statute Law Revision Act 1948 (11 & 12 Geo. 6. c. 62))
Achurch Parish Church Act 1778	18 Geo. 3. c. 9	6 March 1778
An Act for taking down the Parish Church of Lilford, being a Vicarage united to the Rectory of Achurch in the County of Northampton; and for repairing the Parish Church of Achurch aforesaid; and for other Purposes therein mentioned.
Jeremy's Ferry Bridge, River Lee Act 1778 (repealed)	18 Geo. 3. c. 10	6 March 1778
An Act to continue and enlarge the Term and Powers of an Act, made in the Thirtieth Year of the Reign of King George the Second, (Note: River Lea Bridge and Roads Act 1757 (30 Geo. 2. c. 59)) for building a Bridge over the River Lea, at or near a Place called Jeremy's Ferry; (Note: Jeremy's Ferry is now known as Lea Bridge. 51°33′44″N 0°02′44″W) and for making, repairing and widening Roads, from thence into the great Roads at Snaresbrook, in the County of Essex, and at Clapton, in the County of Middlesex. (Repealed by Metropolis Roads Act 1826 (7 Geo. 4. c. cxlii))
Province of Massachusetts Bay Act 1778 (repealed)	18 Geo. 3. c. 11	11 March 1778
An Act for repealing an Act passed in the Fourteenth Year of His present Majesty's Reign, intituled, "An Act for the better regulating the Government of the Province of the Massachusetts Bay, in New England." (Note: Massachusetts Government Act 1774 (14 Geo. 3. c. 45)) (Repealed by Statute Law Revision Act 1871 (34 & 35 Vict. c. 116))
Taxation of Colonies Act 1778 (repealed)	18 Geo. 3. c. 12	11 March 1778
An Act for removing all Doubts and Apprehensions concerning Taxation by the Parliament of Great Britain in any of the Colonies, Provinces, and Plantations in North America and the West Indies; and for repealing so much of an Act made in the Seventh Year of the Reign of His present Majesty, (Note: Duties on Tea, etc. (American Plantations) Act 1766 (7 Geo. 3. c. 46)) as imposes a Duty on Tea imported from Great Britain into any Colony or Plantation in America, or relates thereto. (Repealed by Statute Law (Repeals) Act 1973 (c. 39))
American Rebellion Act 1778 (repealed)	18 Geo. 3. c. 13	11 March 1778
An Act to enable his Majesty to appoint Commissioners with sufficient Powers to treat, consult, and agree upon the Means of quieting the Disorders now subsisting in certain of the Colonies, Plantations, and Provinces of North America. (Repealed by Statute Law Revision Act 1871 (34 & 35 Vict. c. 116))
Militia Act 1778 (repealed)	18 Geo. 3. c. 14	11 March 1778
An Act for defraying the Charge of the Pay and Cloathing of the Militia in that Part of Great Britain called England, for One Year, beginning the Twenty-fifth Day of March One thousand seven hundred and seventy-eight; and for filling up Vacancies in the Militia, in the Cases therein mentioned. (Repealed by Statute Law Revision Act 1861 (24 & 25 Vict. c. 101))
Prize Act 1778 (repealed)	18 Geo. 3. c. 15	11 March 1778
An Act for the Relief of the Captors of Prizes, with respect to the bringing and landing certain Prize Goods in this Kingdom. (Repealed by Naval Prize Acts Repeal Act 1864 (27 & 28 Vict. c. 23))
Exportation Act 1778 (repealed)	18 Geo. 3. c. 16	11 March 1778
An Act for allowing the Exportation of certain Quantities of Wheat-Flour, Biscuit and Pease, to Newfoundland, Nova Scotia, Bay Chaleur and Labrador. (Repealed by Statute Law Revision Act 1861 (24 & 25 Vict. c. 101))
Bodmin Gaol Act 1778 (repealed)	18 Geo. 3. c. 17	27 March 1778
An Act for building an additional Jail, and also a Prison and House of Correction, within the County of Cornwall; and for other Purposes therein mentioned. (Repealed by Statute Law Revision Act 1948 (11 & 12 Geo. 6. c. 62))
Forgery Act 1778 (repealed)	18 Geo. 3. c. 18	27 March 1778
An Act to explain an Act, passed in the Seventh Year of the Reign of His late Majesty King George the Second, intituled, "An Act for the more effectual preventing the forging the Acceptance of Bills of Exchange, or the Numbers or Principal Sums of accountable Receipts for Notes, Bills, or other Securities for Payment of Money, or Warrants, or Orders for Payment of Money or Delivery of Goods." (Note: Forgery Act 1733 (7 Geo. 2. c. 22)) (Repealed by Statute Law Revision Act 1861 (24 & 25 Vict. c. 101))
Payment of Charges of Constables Act 1778 (repealed)	18 Geo. 3. c. 19	27 March 1778
An Act for the Payment of Costs to Parties, on Complaints determined before Justices of the Peace out of Sessions; for the Payment of the Charges of Constables in certain Cases; and for the more effectual Payment of Charges to Witnesses and Prosecutors of any Larceny or other Felony. (Repealed by Statute Law Revision Act 1887 (50 & 51 Vict. c. 59))
Scarborough Pier Act 1778 (repealed)	18 Geo. 3. c. 20	27 March 1778
An Act for further continuing the Duties granted by Three Acts, made in the Fifth (Note: Scarborough Harbour Act 1731 (5 Geo. 2. c. 11)) and Twenty-fifth (Note: Scarborough Harbour Act 1751 (25 Geo. 2. c. 44)) Years of His late Majesty King George the Second, and in the Third Year of His present Majesty's Reign, (Note: Scarborough Pier Act 1763 (3 Geo. 3. c. 42)) for enlarging the Pier and Harbour of Scarborough, in the County of York. (Repealed by Scarborough Harbour Act 1843 (6 & 7 Vict. c. xl))
Chester Canal Act 1778 (repealed)	18 Geo. 3. c. 21	27 March 1778
An Act for the more effectually carrying into Execution the Powers contained in Two several Acts of Parliament, the One made in the Twelfth Year of His present Majesty's Reign, (Note: Chester Canal Act 1772 (12 Geo. 3. c. 75)) for making a Navigable Cut or Canal from the River Dee, within the Liberties of the City of Chester, to or near Middlewich and Nantwich, in the County of Chester; and the other made in the Seventeenth Year of His said Majesty's Reign, (Note: Chester Canal Act 1777 (17 Geo. 3. c. 67)) for varying and enlarging the Powers of the said former Act. (Repealed by Ellesmere and Chester Canals Unification Act 1813 (53 Geo. 3. c. lxxx) and Ellesmere and Chester Canal Act 1827 (7 & 8 Geo. 4. c. cii) (Note: Incorrectly cited as "7-8 G 4 ccii" in the Chronological Table of the Statutes.))
National Debt Act 1778 (repealed)	18 Geo. 3. c. 22	27 March 1778
An Act for raising a certain Sum of Money by way of Annuities; and for establishing a Lottery. (Repealed by Statute Law Revision Act 1870 (33 & 34 Vict. c. 69))
Land Tax (Commissioners) Act 1778 (repealed)	18 Geo. 3. c. 23	10 April 1778
An Act for appointing Commissioners to put in Execution an Act of this Session of Parliament, intituled, "An Act for granting an Aid to His Majesty by a Land Tax to be raised in Great Britain, for the Service of the Year One thousand seven hundred and seventy-eight," (Note: Land Tax Act 1778 (18 Geo. 3. c. 2)) together with those named in Two former Acts, for appointing Commissioners of the Land Tax. (Repealed by Statute Law Revision Act 1871 (34 & 35 Vict. c. 116))
Customs Act 1778 (repealed)	18 Geo. 3. c. 24	10 April 1778
An Act for allowing the Re-importation of unmanufactured Tobacco from Foreign Parts, although the same may have been sold Abroad; and the Importation of Tobacco, the Growth and Product of the Island of Dominica, under certain Regulations and Restrictions. (Repealed by Statute Law Revision Act 1861 (24 & 25 Vict. c. 101))
Customs (No. 2) Act 1778 (repealed)	18 Geo. 3. c. 25	10 April 1778
An Act for allowing Corn, Grain and Flour, imported into the Ports of Portsmouth, Sandwich, Chichester and Chester, to be landed without Payment of the Duties, under the like Restrictions as Corn, Grain and Flour, is allowed to be landed at the several Ports mentioned in an Act, made in the Thirteenth Year of the Reign of His present Majesty, intituled, "An Act to regulate the Importation and Exportation of Corn." (Note: Corn Act 1772 (13 Geo. 3. c. 43)) (Repealed by Statute Law Revision Act 1861 (24 & 25 Vict. c. 101))
House Duty Act 1778 (repealed)	18 Geo. 3. c. 26	16 April 1778
An Act for granting to His Majesty certain Duties upon all inhabited Houses, within the Kingdom of Great Britain. (Repealed by House Tax Act 1803 (43 Geo. 3. c. 161))
Customs (No. 3) Act 1778 (repealed)	18 Geo. 3. c. 27	16 April 1778
An Act for granting to His Majesty several additional Duties upon Wines and Vinegar, imported into this Kingdom. (Repealed by Customs Law Repeal Act 1825 (6 Geo. 4. c. 105))
Turnpike Roads Act 1778 (repealed)	18 Geo. 3. c. 28	10 April 1778
An Act for repealing so much of an Act made in the Thirteenth Year of His present Majesty's Reign, intituled, "An Act to explain, amend and reduce into One Act of Parliament, the General Laws now in being for regulating the Turnpike Roads in that Part of Great Britain called England, and for other Purposes," (Note: Turnpike Roads Act 1773 (13 Geo. 3. c. 84)) as is to subject Carriages, having the Fellies of the Wheels thereof of less Breadth or Gauge than Six Inches, to the Payment of double Tolls; and for vacating Contracts for leasing Tolls. (Repealed by Turnpike Roads Act 1822 (3 Geo. 4. c. 126))
Crown Lands (Greenwich Hospital) Act 1778	18 Geo. 3. c. 29	10 April 1778
An Act for empowering the Commissioners and Governors of the Royal Hospital for Seamen at Greenwich, in the County of Kent, to exchange certain Messuages, Lands, Tenements, Tithes and Hereditaments belonging to them, in the Parishes of Alnwick, Embleton and Warkworth, in the County of Northumberland, for other Lands belonging to the Most Noble Hugh Duke of Northumberland, in some one or more of the Open Common Fields at Corbridge, in the said County; and to empower the said Commissioners and Governors to grant Leases in Manner therein mentioned.
Duty on Servants Act 1778 (repealed)	18 Geo. 3. c. 30	16 April 1778
An Act for the more effectually levying of the Duty upon Servants, in that Part of Great Britain called Scotland. (Repealed by Duties on Servants Act 1781 (21 Geo. 3. c. 31))
Settlement on Royal Princes, etc. Act 1778 (repealed)	18 Geo. 3. c. 31	16 April 1778
An Act for enabling His Majesty to settle on their Royal Highnesses the Princes Frederick Bishop of Osnaburgh, William Henry, Edward, Ernest Augustus, Augustus Frederick and Adolphus Frederick, an Annuity of Sixty thousand Pounds per Annum; and also to settle on their Royal Highnesses the Princesses Charlotte Augusta Matilda, Augusta Sophia, Elizabeth, Mary and Sophia, One other Annuity of Thirty thousand Pounds per Annum; and also to settle on His Highness Prince William Frederick, One other Annuity of Eight thousand Pounds per Annum; and on Her Highness the Princess Sophia Matilda, One other Annuity of Four thousand Pounds per Annum. (Repealed by Statute Law Revision Act 1871 (34 & 35 Vict. c. 116))
Rye Harbour Act 1778 (repealed)	18 Geo. 3. c. 32	10 April 1778
An Act for further continuing so much of certain Duties, as have by several Acts of Parliament been granted and continued for repairing and maintaining the Harbours of Dover and Rye, as are applicable to completing and keeping in Repair the said Harbour of Rye, in the County of Sussex. (Repealed by Rye Harbour Act 1797 (37 Geo. 3. c. 130))
Fisheries (Severn and Verniew) Act 1778 (repealed)	18 Geo. 3. c. 33	10 April 1778
An Act for the better Preservation of Fish, and regulating the Fisheries in the Rivers Severn and Verniew. (Repealed by Severn Fisheries Provisional Order (1910) Confirmation Act 1911 (1 & 2 Geo. 5. c. cxxxix)
Lincolnshire Small Debts Act 1778 (repealed)	18 Geo. 3. c. 34	10 April 1778
An Act for the more easy and speedy Recovery of Small Debts, within the Soake of Bolingbrooke and Wapentake of Candleshoe, in the Parts of Lindsey, in the County of Lincoln. (Repealed by Bolingbroke, &c. Court of Requests Act 1807 (47 Geo. 3 Sess. 2. c. lxxviii) and County Courts Act 1846 (9 & 10 Vict. c. 95))
Stow, Suffolk (Poor Relief) Act 1778 (repealed)	18 Geo. 3. c. 35	10 April 1778
An Act for the better Relief and Employment of the Poor within the Hundred of Stow, in the County of Suffolk. (Repealed by Stow Poor Relief Act 1824 (5 Geo. 4. c. xviii) and Statute Law Revision Act 1948 (11 & 12 Geo. 6. c. 62))
Isle of Ely Small Debts Act 1778 (repealed)	18 Geo. 3. c. 36	10 April 1778
An Act for the more easy and speedy Recovery of Small Debts, within the Isle of Ely, in the County of Cambridge. (Repealed by County Courts Act 1846 (9 & 10 Vict. c. 95))
Whitechapel (Improvement) Act 1778 (repealed)	18 Geo. 3. c. 37	10 April 1778
An Act for paving Parts of the Foot Paths on the Sides of the Great Road called Whitechapel Road, in the County of Middlesex; and also the several Streets, Lanes, Roads and Passages opening into the same; and for preventing Obstructions, Nuisances and Annoyances therein, and near thereto. (Repealed by Whitechapel Improvement Act 1853 (16 & 17 Vict. c. cxli))
Loans or Exchequer Bills Act 1778 (repealed)	18 Geo. 3. c. 38	15 May 1778
An Act for raising a certain Sum of Money by Loans or Exchequer Bills, for the Service of the Year One thousand seven hundred and seventy-eight. (Repealed by Statute Law Revision Act 1871 (34 & 35 Vict. c. 116))
Indemnity Act 1778 (repealed)	18 Geo. 3. c. 39	15 May 1778
An Act to indemnify such Persons as have omitted to qualify themselves for Offices and Employments; and to indemnify Justices of the Peace, or others who have omitted to register or deliver in their Qualifications within the Time limited by Law, and for giving further Time for those Purposes; and to indemnify Members and Officers in Cities, Corporations and Borough Towns, whose Admissions have been omitted to be stamped according to Law, or having been stamped, have been lost or mislaid, and for allowing them Time to provide Admissions duly stamped; and to give further Time to such Persons as have omitted to make and file Affidavits of the Execution of Indentures of Clerks to Attornies and Solicitors. (Repealed by Promissory Oaths Act 1871 (34 & 35 Vict. c. 48))
Customs (No. 4) Act 1778 (repealed)	18 Geo. 3. c. 40	15 May 1778
An Act to repeal such Part of an Act made in the last Session of Parliament, (Note: Customs (No. 5) Act 1776 (17 Geo. 3. c. 41)) as relates to the Manner of discharging Bonds given for the due Exportation of certain Goods from Great Britain to Foreign Parts; and to extend such Part of the same Act as obliges the Master of British or Irish Ships failing from any of His Majesty's Dominions into the Baltic, to deliver a Manifest of their Cargoes to the British Consul residing there, to the like Vessels failing into Denmark, Norway and Archangel. (Note: Archangel is the Port of Arkhangelsk in Russia.) (Repealed by Statute Law Revision Act 1861 (24 & 25 Vict. c. 101))
Henley Grammar School Act 1778	18 Geo. 3. c. 41 (Note: This act was given royal assent as a private act.)	16 April 1778
An Act for uniting the Free Grammar School of James King of England, within the Town of Henley upon Thames, in the County of Oxford, with the Charity School founded in the same Town, By Dame Elizabeth Periam Widow; and for the better Regulation and Management of the said Endowments.
Smalls Lighthouse Act 1778	18 Geo. 3. c. 42	15 May 1778
An Act to enable the Corporation of Trinity House of Deptford Strond, to establish and maintain a Light House on the Rocks called The Smalls, in Saint George's Channel.
Lincoln (Small Debts) Act 1778 (repealed)	18 Geo. 3. c. 43	15 May 1778
An Act to repeal an Act passed in the last Session of Parliament, (Note: Lincolnshire (Small Debts) Act 1777 (17 Geo. 3. c. 62)) for the Recovery of Small Debts within the several Parishes of Surfleet, Gosberton, Quadring, Donnington, Bicker, Swineshead, Wigtoft, Sutterton, Algarkirke, Fosdyke, Kirton, Frampton, Wiberton and Brothertost, within the Hundred of Kirton, and County of Lincoln. (Repealed by Statute Law Revision Act 1948 (11 & 12 Geo. 6. c. 62))
Hexham Bridge Act 1778	18 Geo. 3. c. 44	15 May 1778
An Act for building a Stone Bridge across the River Tyne, opposite the Town of Hexham, in the County of Northumberland; and for making proper Roads and Avenues to and from the same.
Continuance of Laws Act 1778 (repealed)	18 Geo. 3. c. 45	15 May 1778
An Act to continue the several Laws therein mentioned, relating to the Allowance upon the Exportation of British made Gunpowder; to the further encouraging the Manufacture of British Sail Cloth, and to the Duties payable on Foreign Sail Cloth; to the granting a Liberty to carry Sugars, of the Growth, Produce or Manufacture of any of His Majesty's Sugar Colonies, directly to Foreign Parts, in Ships built in Great Britain, and navigated according to Law; to the further Punishment of Persons going armed or disguised in Defiance of the Laws of Customs or Excise; to the prohibiting the Importation of light Silver Coin of this Realm from Foreign Countries into Great Britain or Ireland, and to restrain the Tender thereof beyond a certain Sum; to the granting a Bounty upon Flax Seed imported into Ireland; to the better regulating of Pilots for the conducting of Ships and Vessels from Dover, Deal and Isle of Thanet; and to revive and continue so much of an Act, made in the Sixteenth Year of His present Majesty's Reign, (Note: Exportation Act 1776 (16 Geo. 3. c. 37)) as relates to allowing the Exportation of certain Quantities of Wheat and other Articles, to His Majesty's Sugar Colonies in America. (Repealed by Statute Law Revision Act 1871 (34 & 35 Vict. c. 116))
Papists (No. 1) Act 1778 (repealed)	18 Geo. 3. c. 46	15 May 1778
An Act for allowing further Time for Inrollment of Deeds and Wills made by Papists; and for Relief of Protestant Purchasers. (Repealed by Statute Law Revision Act 1871 (34 & 35 Vict. c. 116))
Parish Apprentices Act 1778 (repealed)	18 Geo. 3. c. 47	15 May 1778
An Act to amend such Part of an Act, made in the Forty-third Year of the Reign of Queen Elizabeth, intituled, "An Act for the Relief of the Poor," (Note: Poor Relief Act 1601 (43 Eliz. 1. c. 2)) as relates to the binding of Parish Apprentices. (Repealed by Poor Law Act 1927 (17 & 18 Geo. 5. c. 14))
Newgate Gaol and Sessions House Act 1778 (repealed)	18 Geo. 3. c. 48	15 May 1778
An Act for empowering the Mayor, Aldermen and Commons of the City of London, in Common Council assembled, to raise upon the Credit of the Surplusses to arise out of a certain Fund, commonly called The Orphans Fund, the Sum of Forty thousand Pounds towards discharging the Debt incurred in re-building the Gaol of Newgate, and a Sessions House adjoining, and for completing the said Gaol, and building an Infirmary thereto; and other the Purposes therein mentioned. (Repealed by Statute Law (Repeals) Act 2008 (c. 12))
Ratcliffe Highway Act 1778 (repealed)	18 Geo. 3. c. 49	15 May 1778
An Act for applying the Sum of One thousand Pounds, to arise out of the Surplusses of a certain Fund, commonly called The Orphans Fund, for the Purpose of opening Communications between Wapping Street and Ratcliff Highway, and between Old Gravel Lane and Virginia Street, within the Parishes of Saint George and Saint John, Wapping, in the County of Middlesex. (Repealed by Statute Law (Repeals) Act 2013 (c. 2))
Goodman's Fields Act 1778 (repealed)	18 Geo. 3. c. 50	15 May 1778
An Act for applying the Sum of One thousand five hundred Pounds, to arise out of the Surplusses of a certain Fund, commonly called The Orphans Fund, for the Purpose of widening certain Avenues leading into Goodman's Fields, in the County of Middlesex. (Repealed by Statute Law (Repeals) Act 2013 (c. 2))
Southwark (Streets) Act 1778 (repealed)	18 Geo. 3. c. 51	15 May 1778
An Act for applying the Sum of Four thousand Pounds, to arise out of the Surplusses of a certain Fund, commonly called The Orphans Fund, towards completing the Paving of the Town and Borough of Southwark, and certain Parts adjacent, in the County of Surrey. (Repealed by Statute Law (Repeals) Act 2013 (c. 2))
Insolvent Debtors Relief, etc. Act 1778 (repealed)	18 Geo. 3. c. 52	28 May 1778
An Act for the Relief of Insolvent Debtors; and for the Relief of Bankrupts, in certain Cases. (Repealed by Statute Law Revision Act 1871 (34 & 35 Vict. c. 116))
Recruiting Act 1778 (repealed)	18 Geo. 3. c. 53	28 May 1778
An Act for the more easy and better Recruiting of His Majesty's Land Forces and Marines. (Repealed by Recruiting Act 1779 (19 Geo. 3. c. 10))
Appropriation Act 1778 (repealed)	18 Geo. 3. c. 54	3 June 1778
An Act for granting to His Majesty a certain Sum of Money out of the Sinking Fund, and for applying certain Monies therein mentioned, for the Service of the Year One thousand seven hundred and seventy-eight; and for further appropriating the Supplies granted in this Session of Parliament; and for carrying to the Aggregate Fund, a Sum of Money which hath arisen by the Two Sevenths Excise. (Repealed by Statute Law Revision Act 1871 (34 & 35 Vict. c. 116))
Exportation, etc. Act 1778 (repealed)	18 Geo. 3. c. 55	28 May 1778
An Act to permit the Exportation of certain Goods directly from Ireland, into any British Plantation in America, or any British Settlement on the Coast of Africa; and for further encouraging the Fisheries and Navigation of Ireland. (Repealed by Statute Law Revision Act 1861 (24 & 25 Vict. c. 101))
Importation Act 1778 (repealed)	18 Geo. 3. c. 56	28 May 1778
An Act to permit the Importation of Cotton Yarn, the Manufacture of Ireland, into this Kingdom, Duty free. (Repealed by Statute Law Revision Act 1861 (24 & 25 Vict. c. 101))
Loans or Exchequer Bills (No. 2) Act 1778 (repealed)	18 Geo. 3. c. 57	28 May 1778
An Act for raising a further Sum of Money by Loans or Exchequer Bills, for the Service of the Year One thousand seven hundred and seventy-eight. (Repealed by Statute Law Revision Act 1871 (34 & 35 Vict. c. 116))
Customs (No. 5) Act 1778 (repealed)	18 Geo. 3. c. 58	28 May 1778
An Act to explain and amend so much of an Act made in the Fourth Year of the Reign of His present Majesty, (Note: Sugar Act 1763 (4 Geo. 3. c. 15)) as relates to the preventing the clandestine Conveyance of Sugar and Paneles from the British Colonies and Plantations in America, into Great Britain. (Repealed by Customs Law Repeal Act 1825 (6 Geo. 4. c. 105))
Militia, etc. Act 1778 (repealed)	18 Geo. 3. c. 59	3 June 1778
An Act to amend and render more effectual the Laws relating to the raising and training the Militia within that Part of Great Britain called England; and to establish certain Regulations with respect to Officers serving in the Corps of Fencible Men, directed to be raised in that Part of Great Britain called Scotland, and certain other Corps therein mentioned. (Repealed by Statute Law Revision Act 1861 (24 & 25 Vict. c. 101))
Papists Act 1778 or Sir George Savile's Act or the First Relief Act or the Catholic Relief Act 1778 (repealed)	18 Geo. 3. c. 60	3 June 1778
An Act for relieving His Majesty's Subjects professing the Popish Religion, from certain Penalties and Disabilities imposed on them, by an Act made in the Eleventh and Twelfth Years of the Reign of King William the Third, intituled, "An Act for the further preventing the Growth of Popery." (Note: Popery Act 1698 (11 Will. 3. c. 4)) (Repealed by Promissory Oaths Act 1871 (34 & 35 Vict. c. 48))
Crown Lands (Forfeited Estates) (Ireland) Act 1778 (repealed)	18 Geo. 3. c. 61	3 June 1778
An Act for repealing certain Provisions in Two Acts made in the First Year of the Reign of Queen Anne, One intituled, "An Act for the Relief of the Protestant Purchasers of the Forfeited Estates in Ireland;" (Note: Purchasers of Forfeited Estates (Ireland) Act 1702 (1 Ann. c. 26)) and the other, intituled, "An Act for advancing the Sale of the Forfeited Estates in Ireland, and for vesting such as remain unsold by the present Trustees, in Her Majesty, Her Heirs and Successors, for such Uses as the same were before vested in the said Trustees; and for the more effectual selling and setting the said Estates to Protestants; and for explaining several Acts relative to the Lord Bophin and Sir Redmond Everard." (Note: Crown Lands, Forfeited Estates (Ireland) Act 1702 (1 Ann. St. 2. c. 18)) (Repealed by Statute Law (Repeals) Act 1978 (c. 45))
Criminal Law Act 1778 (repealed)	18 Geo. 3. c. 62	28 May 1778
An Act to continue an Act made in the Sixteenth Year of His present Majesty, intituled, "An Act to authorize, for a limited Time, the Punishment by hard Labour of Offenders who, for certain Crimes, are or shall become liable to be transported to any of His Majesty's Colonies and Plantations." (Note: Criminal Law Act 1776 (16 Geo. 3. c. 43)) (Repealed by Statute Law Revision Act 1871 (34 & 35 Vict. c. 116))
Turnpike Roads (No. 2) Act 1778 (repealed)	18 Geo. 3. c. 63	28 May 1778
An Act for enabling Trustees under particular Turnpike Acts, to meet and carry such Acts into Execution, notwithstanding they may not have met or adjourned agreeable to the Directions of such Acts; and for preventing Disputes touching the Payment of Tolls for Horses or Carriages belonging to or employed by Officers or Soldiers on Duty. (Repealed by Turnpike Roads Act 1822 (3 Geo. 4. c. 126))
Loans or Exchequer Bills (No. 3) Act 1778 (repealed)	18 Geo. 3. c. 64	28 May 1778
An Act for enabling His Majesty to raise the Sum of One Million, for the Uses and Purposes therein mentioned. (Repealed by Statute Law Revision Act 1871 (34 & 35 Vict. c. 116))
Provision for Earl of Chatham Act 1778 (repealed)	18 Geo. 3. c. 65	3 June 1778
An Act for settling and securing a certain Annuity on the Earl of Chatham, and the Heirs of the Body of the late William Pitt Earl of Chatham, to whom the Earldom of Chatham shall descend, in Consideration of the eminent Services performed by the said late Earl, to His Majesty and the Publick. (Repealed by Statute Law Revision Act 1871 (34 & 35 Vict. c. 116))
Halliwell and Finsbury Drainage Act 1778	18 Geo. 3. c. 66	16 April 1778
An Act for making proper Drains and Sewers for the Purpose of carrying off the Water from the Prebendal Estate of Halliwell and Finsbury, in the Suburbs of the City of London; and for other Purposes therein mentioned.
Middlesex Sessions House Act 1778 (repealed)	18 Geo. 3. c. 67	15 May 1778
An Act for authorizing the Justices of the Peace for the County of Middlesex, to sell the present Session House for the said County; and for enabling them to build another Session House in a more convenient Situation, and to keep the same in Repair; and for applying the Sum of Eleven thousand Pounds (to be borrowed upon the Credit of the Surplusses of a certain Fund, commonly called The Orphans Fund), to wards defraying the Expence of building the said Session House. (Repealed by Statute Law (Repeals) Act 2008 (c. 12))
Wychtree Bridge Act 1778 (repealed)	18 Geo. 3. c. 68	15 May 1778
An Act for building a Bridge across the River Tawey, at a Place called The Wich Tree, in the Parish of Llansamlett, to the opposite Shore, in the Parish of Llangevelach, in the County of Glamorgan; (Note: Wychtree Bridge, Morriston, demolished in 1959; on the route of the A48 road. Designed by William Edwards.) for making proper Avenues or Roads to and from the said Bridge; and also for repairing and widening the Road from Pentre Brook, near a Place called Aberdwyberthy, in the Parish of Saint John's near Swansea, to the said intended Bridge. (Repealed by South Wales Turnpike Trusts Act 1844 (7 & 8 Vict. c. 91))
Stirling (Roads and Bridges) Act 1778 (repealed)	18 Geo. 3. c. 69	15 May 1778
An Act for repairing the Highways and Bridges, in the County of Stirling. (Repealed by Roads and Bridges (Scotland) Act 1878 (41 & 42 Vict. c. 51) and Local Government (Scotland) Act 1889 (52 & 53 Vict. c. 50))
Findhorn Harbour Act 1778	18 Geo. 3. c. 70	15 May 1778
An Act to enable Hector Munro Esquire, to build and maintain a Harbour and Pier at the Town of Findhorn, in the County of Elgin and Forres.
London (Streets) Act 1778	18 Geo. 3. c. 71	15 May 1778
An Act for empowering the Mayor, Aldermen and Commons of the City of London, in Common Council assembled, to make a Street or Opening from Moorfields, opposite Chiswell Street, towards the East, into Bishopsgate Street; and also from the East End of Chiswell Street Westward, into Barbican; and to raise upon the Credit of the Surplusses to arise out of a certain Fund, commonly called The Orphans Fund, the Sum of Sixteen thousand five hundred Pounds, for such Purpose.
Westminster (Improvement) Act 1778 (repealed)	18 Geo. 3. c. 72	28 May 1778
An Act for erecting a Building for holding the Courts, and exercising the Jurisdiction of the Dean and Chapter of the Collegiate Church of Saint Peter in Westminster, within the City and Liberty of Westminster, and for holding the Quarter Sessions of the Peace, and transacting the other Public Business of the said City and Liberty; and for appropriating Part of the Surplusses of The Orphans Fund, towards defraying the Expence thereof. (Repealed by Statute Law (Repeals) Act 2008 (c. 12))
London (Streets) (No. 2) Act 1778 (repealed)	18 Geo. 3. c. 73	15 May 1778
An Act for paving the High Street or Road leading from Aldersgate Bars, in the Parish of Saint Botolph without Aldersgate, London, to the Turnpike near the End of Goswell Street, in the County of Middlesex; and for applying the Sum of Five thousand Pounds, to be raised upon the Credit of the Surplusses to arise out of a certain Fund, commonly called The Orphans Fund, for such Purpose. (Repealed by Statute Law (Repeals) Act 2013 (c. 2))
Christchurch, Stepney (Poor Relief, etc.) Act 1778 (repealed)	18 Geo. 3. c. 74	15 May 1778
An Act to amend an Act, passed in the Twenty-sixth Year of King George the Second, (Note: Christchurch, Stepney (Poor Relief) Act 1753 (26 Geo. 2. c. 98)) more effectually to enable the Parishioners of the Parish of Christ Church, in the County of Middlesex, to purchase, hire or erect a Workhouse for the employing and maintaining the Poor of the said Parish; and for the more effectual Support and Employment of the Poor therein. (Repealed by London Government (Borough of Stepney) Order in Council 1901 (SR&O 1901/276))
Basingstoke Canal Act 1778	18 Geo. 3. c. 75	15 May 1778
An Act for making a navigable Canal from the Town of Basingstoke, in the County of Southampton, to communicate with the River Wey, in the Parish of Chertsey, in the County of Surrey, and to the South-East Side of the Turnpike Road in the Parish of Turgiss, in the said County of Southampton.
Dover Streets Act 1778	18 Geo. 3. c. 76	15 May 1778
An Act for better paving, cleansing, lighting and watching, the Streets and Lanes within the Town of Dover, in the County of Kent, and in the several Parishes of Saint Mary the Virgin and Saint James the Apostle, in the said Town and County; and for removing and preventing Nuisances and Annoyances therein.
Shoreditch (Streets) Act 1778 (repealed)	18 Geo. 3. c. 77	15 May 1778
An Act for paving and repairing the Streets, Lanes and other Public Passages and Places, within such Part of the Liberty of Norton Folgate, in the County of Middlesex, as is extra-parochial; and certain Parts of Magpie Alley and Blossom Street, in the Parish of Saint Leonard Shoreditch, in the said County; and for removing Obstructions and Annoyances therein. (Repealed by Statute Law (Repeals) Act 2013 (c. 2))
Spitalfields (Streets) Act 1778 (repealed)	18 Geo. 3. c. 78	15 May 1778
An Act for applying the Sum of Nine thousand Pounds, to arise out of the Surplusses of a certain Fund commonly called The Orphans Fund, for the Purpose of making a Passage for Carriages from Spital Fields to Bishopsgate Street, in the County of Middlesex. (Repealed by Statute Law (Repeals) Act 2013 (c. 2))
Northampton (Improvement) Act 1778 (repealed)	18 Geo. 3. c. 79	15 May 1778
An Act for paving, cleansing, lighting, and watching, the Town of Northampton; and for removing and preventing Encroachments, Obstructions and Annoyances therein. (Repealed by Northampton Improvement and South Bridge Act 1814 (54 Geo. 3. c. cxciii))
Whitechapel (Improvement) (No. 2) Act 1778 (repealed)	18 Geo. 3. c. 80	28 May 1778
An Act for widening and improving a certain Avenue called Dirty Lane, and Part of Brick Lane, leading from Whitechapel to Spital Fields in the County of Middlesex; and for paving Dirty Lane, and also the East Side of Petticoat Lane, from Whitechapel High Street to Wentworth Street; the said Avenue called Wentworth Street, from thence in one continued Line through Old Montague Street, Chapel Street and Prince's Row to Baker's Row inclusive, and the several Streets and Passages leading into the same; and for removing all Obstructions and Encroachments therefrom, and preventing the like for the future. (Repealed by Whitechapel Improvement Act 1853 (16 & 17 Vict. c. cxli))
Oxford and Berks Roads Act 1778 (repealed)	18 Geo. 3. c. 81	6 March 1778
An Act for continuing the Terms and enlarging the Powers of Two Acts, One passed in the Seventh, (Note: Oxford and Fifield Road Act 1766 (7 Geo. 3. c. 66)) and the other in the Eighth (Note: Oxford Roads Act 1768 (8 Geo. 3. c. 34)) Years of His present Majesty's Reign, for repairing and widening the Roads from Oxford over Botley Causeway to Fifield, in the County of Berks, and Witney, in the County of Oxford. (Repealed by Oxford, Fifield and Witney Roads Act 1835 (5 & 6 Will. 4. c. ciii))
Stevenage to Biggleswade Road Act 1778 (repealed)	18 Geo. 3. c. 82	6 March 1778
An Act to enlarge the Term and Powers of several Acts, passed in the Sixth (Note: Stevenage and Biggleswade Road Act 1719 (6 Geo. 1. c. 25)) and Twelfth (Note: Hertfordshire Roads Act 1725 (12 Geo. 1. c. 10)) Years of King George the First, the Twenty-eighth Year of His late Majesty, (Note: Stevenage and Biggleswade Road Act 1755 (28 Geo. 2. c. 30)) and the Ninth Year of His present Majesty, (Note: Hertford and Bedford Roads Act 1769 (9 Geo. 3. c. 64)) for repairing the Roads from Stevenage, in the County of Hertford, to Biggleswade, in the County of Bedford, and other Roads therein mentioned. (Repealed by Stevenage, Biggleswade and Arsley Road Act 1832 (2 & 3 Will. 4. c. lxxvi))
Northumberland Roads Act 1778 (repealed)	18 Geo. 3. c. 83	6 March 1778
An Act to enlarge the Term and Powers of an Act, made in the Twenty-fifth Year of the Reign of His late Majesty King George the Second, (Note: Northumberland Roads Act 1751 (25 Geo. 2. c. 18)) for repairing the Road leading from Long Horsley Bar or Gate, on the Post Road near the Town of Morpeth, by or through Long Horsley, Weldon Bridge, and Whittingham, to the River Breamish, and from thence to Percy's Cross, in the County of Northumberland. (Repealed by Morpeth and Piercy's Cross Road (Northumberland) Act 1799 (39 Geo. 3. c. xliii))
Middlesex Roads Act 1778 (repealed)	18 Geo. 3. c. 84	6 March 1778
An Act to enlarge the Term and Powers of several Acts, for repairing the Road from Highgate Gate House, in the County of Middlesex, to Barnet Block House, in the County of Hertford; and the Road from the Bear Inn in Hadley, to the Angel in Enfield Chace; and also Canewood Lane, leading from Highgate to Hampstead, in the said County of Middlesex, and the Road beginning at Barnet Block House and ending at the Bear Inn in Hadley aforesaid. (Repealed by Highgate and South Mimms Road Act 1815 (55 Geo. 3. c. l))
Wakefield Roads Act 1778 (repealed)	18 Geo. 3. c. 85	6 March 1778
An Act for continuing the Term, and altering and enlarging the Powers of an Act, made in the Thirty-second Year of the Reign of His late Majesty King George the Second, (Note: Wakefield to Austerlands Road Act 1758 (32 Geo. 2. c. 48)) for repairing the Road from Wakefield to Austerlands, in the West Riding of the County of York. (Repealed by Wakefield and Austerlands Road Act 1820 (1 Geo. 4. c. lxviii))
Chester and Whitchurch Roads Act 1778 (repealed)	18 Geo. 3. c. 86	6 March 1778
An Act to enlarge the Term and Powers of an Act passed in the Thirty-third Year of King George the Second, (Note: Chester to Birmingham Road Act 1759 (33 Geo. 2. c. 51)) for repairing and widening the Road from the Bars at Boughton, within the Liberties of the City of Chester, to Whitchurch, and from thence to Newport, in the County of Salop, and other Roads in the said Act mentioned; and for making a Road of Communication from the said Road between Whitchurch and Newport, to the present Turnpike Road from Newport aforesaid, to Eccleshall, in the County of Stafford. (Repealed by Road from Whitchurch (Salop.) to Ternhill Act 1822 (3 Geo. 4. c. lxiv), Welsh Harp and Stonebridge, and Castle Bromwich and Birmingham Roads Act 1823 (4 Geo. 4. c. cxxi) and Road from Ternhill to Newport (Salop.) Act 1832 (2 & 3 Will. 4. c. lxxii))
Northants and Oxford Roads Act 1778 (repealed)	18 Geo. 3. c. 87	6 March 1778
An Act to enlarge the Term of an Act, passed in the Thirtieth Year of His late Majesty King George the Second, (Note: Oxfordshire Roads Act 1757 (30 Geo. 2. c. 48)) for repairing and widening the Road from Towcester, through Silverston and Brackley, in the County of Northampton; and Ardley and Middleton Stoney, to Weston Gate, in the Parish of Weston on the Green, in the County of Oxford. (Repealed by Towcester to Weston Gate Road Act 1820 (1 Geo. 4. c. lxxiii))
Salop Roads Act 1778 (repealed)	18 Geo. 3. c. 88	6 March 1778
An Act for repairing and widening the Road from the Birches Brook to Buildwas Bridge, (Note: Buildwas Bridge, in Buildwas, Shropshire. 52°38′11″N 2°31′33″W) and from thence to join the Watling Street Turnpike Road at Tern Bridge, (Note: Junction with the B4380 (formerly the A5) east of Tern Bridge, Atcham, Shropshire. 52°40′49″N 2°39′28″W) in the County of Salop. (Repealed by Buildwas Bridge and Tern Bridge Road Act 1820 (60 Geo. 3 & 1 Geo. 4. c. v), Annual Turnpike Acts Continuance Act 1875 (38 & 39 Vict. c. cxciv) and Statute Law (Repeals) Act 2013 (c. 2))
Much Wenlock Roads Act 1778 (repealed)	18 Geo. 3. c. 89	6 March 1778
An Act for enlarging the Term and Powers of an Act, made in the Twenty-ninth Year of the Reign of His late Majesty King George the Second, (Note: Much Wenlock Roads Act 1756 (29 Geo. 2. c. 60)) for amending, widening and keeping in Repair, several Roads leading from the Market House, in the Town of Much Wenlock, in the County of Salop; and for amending, widening and keeping in Repair, the Road leading from Gleeton Hill to Cressage, in the said County. (Repealed by Much Wenlock and Gleeton Hill and Cressage Roads Act 1820 (60 Geo. 3 & 1 Geo. 4. c. vi) and Annual Turnpike Acts Continuance Act 1867 (30 & 31 Vict. c. 121))
Hertford Roads Act 1778 (repealed)	18 Geo. 3. c. 90	6 March 1778
An Act to enlarge the Term and Powers of Three Acts of the Third (Note: Middlesex and Hertford Roads Act 1729 (3 Geo. 2. c. 10)) and Seventeenth (Note: Middlesex and Hertford Roads Act 1743 (17 Geo. 2. c. 14)) Years of the Reign of King George the Second, and the Tenth Year of the Reign of His present Majesty, (Note: Middlesex and Hertford Roads Act 1770 (10 Geo. 3. c. 71)) for repairing the Road leading from Galley Corner adjoining to Enfield Chace, in the Parish of South Mims, in the County of Middlesex, to Lemsford Mill, in the County of Hertford. (Repealed by Enfield Chase Road Act 1831 (1 Will. 4. c. lx))
Stokenchurch and New Woodstock Road Act 1778 (repealed)	18 Geo. 3. c. 91	6 March 1778
An Act for repairing and widening the Road from Stokenchurch, (Note: Stokenchurch, Oxfordshire.) in the County of Oxford, to Wheatley Bridge, (Note: Wheatley Bridge, where the London Road (former A40) crosses the River Thame east of Wheatley, Oxfordshire. 51°44′32″N 1°06′54″W) and from the said Bridge to Enslow Bridge, (Note: Enslow Bridge, where the A4095 road crosses the River Cherwell, west of Enslow, Oxfordshire. 51°51′45″N 1°18′28″W) and from Wheatley Bridge to the Mile Way leading towards Magdalen Bridge, and from the Mile Way leading from Saint Giles's Church near the City of Oxford, by Begbroke, to New Woodstock, in the said County. (Repealed by Stokenchurch and New Woodstock Road Act 1824 (5 Geo. 4. c. xcix))
Thirsk Roads Act 1778 (repealed)	18 Geo. 3. c. 92	27 March 1778
An Act for continuing the Term, and altering and enlarging the Powers of an Act, made in the Twenty-sixth Year of the Reign of His late Majesty, (Note: Thirsk Roads Act 1753 (26 Geo. 2. c. 75)) for widening and repairing the High Road leading from Northallerton to the South Wall of the Church Yard of the Town of Thirsk; and from the South East End of the Street called Finkell Street, in Thirsk aforesaid, to and through the Town of Easingwould, in the County of York, to a Place called Burton Stone, near the City of York; and also the Road from Thirsk aforesaid, to Topcliffe, in the North Riding of the County of York. (Repealed by Roads from Northallerton and Thirsk Act 1808 (48 Geo. 3. c. vii) and Thirsk Turnpike Roads Act 1830 (11 Geo. 4 & 1 Will. 4. c. iv))
Evesham Roads Act 1778 (repealed)	18 Geo. 3. c. 93	11 March 1778
An Act for repealing certain Parts of Three several Acts of Parliament of the First, (Note: Evesham Roads Act 1727 (1 Geo. 2. St. 2. c. 11)) the Seventeenth, (Note: Worcester Roads Act 1743 (17 Geo. 2. c. 13)) and the Thirtieth (Note: Worcester, Warwick and Gloucester Roads Act 1757 (30 Geo. 2. c. 64)) Years of the Reign of His late Majesty King George the Second, made for repairing several Roads leading to and from the Borough of Evesham, in the County of Worcester; and for repairing and widening the Road from Evesham Bridge (Note: The medieval bridge in Evesham, replaced by the Workman Bridge in 1856. 52°05′29″N 1°56′35″W) in the said Borough, to the Globe Inn, (Note: The Globe Inn stood at the junction of Evesham Road and Swan Street in Alcester, Warwickshire. The site is now occupied by a roundabout. 52°12′50″N 1°52′20″W) in Alcester, in the County of Warwick. (Repealed by Evesham and Alcester Road Act 1819 (59 Geo. 3. c. xlvi) (Note: Incorrectly cited as "59 Geo. 3. c. xliv" in the Chronological Table of the Statutes.) and Annual Turnpike Acts Continuance Act 1871 (34 & 35 Vict. c. 115))
Hertford and Broadwater and Ware and Walkern Roads Act 1778 (repealed)	18 Geo. 3. c. 94	27 March 1778
An Act for enlarging the Term and Powers of an Act, made in the Thirtieth Year of the Reign of His late Majesty King George the Second, (Note: Hertford and Broadwater Road Act 1757 (30 Geo. 2. c. 45)) for amending, widening and keeping in Repair, the Roads from the East End of the Town of Hertford, in the County of Hertford, through Watton to Broadwater; and from the Town of Ware, through Watton, to the North End of the Town of Walkern, in the said County. (Repealed by Hertford and Broadwater, and Ware and Walkern Roads Act 1820 (1 Geo. 4. c. lxx) and Annual Turnpike Acts Continuance Act 1871 (34 & 35 Vict. c. 115))
Somerset and Dorset Roads Act 1778 (repealed)	18 Geo. 3. c. 95	27 March 1778
An Act for amending, widening, turning, altering and keeping in Repair, the Roads from Whistle Bridge, in the Parish of Barwick, in the County of Somerset, to the Turnpike Road in the Parish of Charminster, in the County of Dorset; and from the Cross in the Town of Maiden Newton, to a Stream of Water in the Parish of South Perrott, in the County of Dorset; and from a Place called Furzmoor Gate, in the Parish of Broad Winsor, to Lenham's Water, in the Parish of Beamister; and from Bugler's Corner, in the Town of Beamister, to the Dorsetshire Inn, in the Parish of Woolcombe; and from Upsydling Ewe Leaze, to the Town of Cerne Ahbas; and from the Town of Frampton, to join the Western Turnpike Road near Steepleton, in the said County of Dorset. (Repealed by Maiden Newton Roads Act 1819 (59 Geo. 3. c. iv) and Maiden Newton Roads Act 1840 (3 & 4 Vict. c. lxv))
Yorkshire Roads Act 1778 (repealed)	18 Geo. 3. c. 96	27 March 1778
An Act for continuing the Term, and altering and enlarging the Powers of an Act, made in the Thirty-second Year of the Reign of His late Majesty King George the Second, (Note: Yorkshire Roads Act 1758 (32 Geo. 2. c. 70)) for repairing and widening the Road leading from the East Side of Barnsley Common, in the County of York, to the Middle of Grange Moor, and from thence to White Cross; and also the Road from the Guide Post in Barugh, to a Rivulet called Barugh Brook, and from thence for Two hundred Yards over and beyond the same Rivulet or Brook, into the Township of Cawthorne, in the said County. (Repealed by Roads from Barnsley Common and from Barugh (Yorkshire) Act 1823 (4 Geo. 4. c. lxvi))
Taunton Roads Act 1778 (repealed)	18 Geo. 3. c. 97	27 March 1778
An Act for more effectually amending, widening and keeping in Repair, several Roads leading from the Town of Taunton, in the County of Somerset; and for repealing Two Acts, one of the Twenty-fifth Year of His late Majesty, (Note: Taunton Roads Act 1751 (25 Geo. 2. c. 54)) and the other of the Fifth Year of His present Majesty, (Note: Taunton Roads Act 1765 (5 Geo. 3. c. 92)) relating to the said Roads; and for amending, widening and keeping in Repair, several other Roads adjoining thereto. (Repealed by Taunton Roads Act 1799 (39 Geo. 3. c. xxxviii), Taunton Roads Act 1817 (57 Geo. 3. c. lxvii) (Note: Incorrectly cited as "59 Geo. 3. c. lxxvii" in the Chronological Table of the Statutes.) and Taunton Roads Act 1840 (3 & 4 Vict. c. xxxvi))
Gloucester to Stroud Road Act 1778 (repealed)	18 Geo. 3. c. 98	27 March 1778
An Act for repairing and widening the Road from the City of Gloucester to the Town of Stroud, in the County of Gloucester. (Repealed by Stroud, Painswick and Gloucester Road Act 1854 (17 & 18 Vict. c. xcv))
Berks Roads Act 1778 (repealed)	18 Geo. 3. c. 99	27 March 1778
An Act for enlarging the Term and Powers of an Act, made in the Twenty-ninth Year of the Reign of His late Majesty King George the Second, (Note: Berkshire Roads (No. 2) Act 1756 (29 Geo. 2. c. 81)) for amending and keeping in Repair the Roads leading from a Place called Fryer Bacon's Study to Chilton Pond; and from the Top of Hinksey Hill to Foxcombe Hill Gate, in the Road leading to Farringdon, in the County of Berks. (Repealed by Abingdon and Chilton Pond Road Act 1841 (4 & 5 Vict. c. cxi) and Statute Law (Repeals) Act 2013 (c. 2))
Somerset Roads Act 1778 (repealed)	18 Geo. 3. c. 100	27 March 1778
An Act for continuing the Term, and altering and enlarging the Powers of an Act, made in the Twenty-sixth Year of the Reign of His late Majesty, (Note: Somerset Roads (No. 3) Act 1753 (26 Geo. 2. c. 92)) for repairing, amending and widening the several Roads leading from the Red Post in the Parish of Fivehead, through the Towns of Langport and Somerton to Butwell; and also from Curry Rivell to Puckington Lane, and from Cary Bridge to Street Cross, in the County of Somerset; and for amending, widening and keeping in Repair, several other Roads adjoining thereto. (Repealed by Langport, Somerton and Castle Cary Roads Act 1824 (5 Geo. 4. c. xcviii))
Somerset Roads (No. 2) Act 1778 (repealed)	18 Geo. 3. c. 101	27 March 1778
An Act for continuing the Term, and altering and enlarging the Powers of an Act, made in the Twenty-sixth Year of the Reign of His late Majesty, (Note: Somerset Roads (No. 2) Act 1753 (26 Geo. 2. c. 71)) for repairing and widening the Roads therein mentioned, leading to and from the Towns of Shipton Malet and Ivelchester, in the County of Somerset, so far as the same relates to the Roads therein called The Ivelchester Turnpike Roads. (Repealed by Ilchester Roads Act 1800 (39 & 40 Geo. 3. c. vii))
Gloucester Roads Act 1778 (repealed)	18 Geo. 3. c. 102	27 March 1778
An Act to enlarge the Term and Powers of an Act, passed in the Twenty-ninth Year of the Reign of King George the Second, (Note: Gloucester Roads Act 1756 (29 Geo. 2. c. 58)) for repairing and widening the Roads leading from the City of Gloucester, towards Cheltenham and Tewkesbury, in the County of Gloucester. (Repealed by Roads from Gloucester to Cheltenham Act 1818 (58 Geo. 3. c. v), Annual Turnpike Acts Continuance Act 1871 (34 & 35 Vict. c. 115) and Statute Law (Repeals) Act 2013 (c. 2))
Wilts and Gloucester Roads Act 1778 (repealed)	18 Geo. 3. c. 103	10 April 1778
An Act for repairing and widening the Road from Chippenham Bridge, in the County of Wilts, to the Top of Togg Hill, in the County of Gloucester, and from the Stone Pillar to the Top of Old Sodbury Hill, in the said County of Gloucester. (Repealed by Chippenham and Westerleigh Road Act 1800 (39 & 40 Geo. 3. c. xlvi) and Chippenham Bridge Road Act 1804 (44 Geo. 3. c. lxix))
Lincoln Roads Act 1778 (repealed)	18 Geo. 3. c. 104	10 April 1778
An Act for enlarging the Term and Powers of an Act, made in the Thirty-first Year of the Reign of His late Majesty King George the Second, intituled, "An Act for repairing and widening the Roads from Donington High Bridge to Hale Drove, and to the Eighth Mile Stone, in the Parish of Wigtoft, and to Langret Ferry, in the County of Lincoln." (Note: Lincoln Roads Act 1757 (31 Geo. 2. c. 50)) (Repealed by Roads from Donington High Bridge Act 1822 (3 Geo. 4. c. ix))
Wakefield to Sheffield Road Act 1778 (repealed)	18 Geo. 3. c. 105	10 April 1778
An Act for enlarging the Term and Powers of an Act, made in the Thirty-first Year of the Reign of His late Majesty, (Note: Leeds and Wakefield Road Act 1757 (31 Geo. 2. c. 63)) for repairing the Road from Leeds to Sheffield, in the County of York, so far as the same relates to the Road from Wakefield to Sheffield; and also One other Act made in the First Year of the Reign of His present Majesty, (Note: Leeds to Sheffield Road Act 1760 (1 Geo. 3. c. 33)) for amending and rendering more effectual the said Act. (Repealed by Wakefield and Sheffield Road Act 1813 (53 Geo. 3. c. xlviii) and Wakefield and Sheffield Road Act 1830 (11 Geo. 4 & 1 Will. 4. c. xxii))
Reading to Basingstoke Road Act 1778 (repealed)	18 Geo. 3. c. 106	10 April 1778
An Act to enlarge the Term and Powers of several Acts passed in the Fourth Year of King George the First, (Note: Reading and Basingstoke Road Act 1717 (4 Geo. 1. c. 7 Pr.)) and the Ninth (Note: Reading and Basingstoke Road Act 1735 (9 Geo. 2. c. 16)) and Thirtieth (Note: Reading and Basingstoke Road Act 1757 (30 Geo. 2. c. 53)) Years of King George the Second, for repairing the Highways from Crown Corner, (Note: Crown Corner is located in Reading at the junction of the A4 Crown Street/London Road, and the A327 Silver Street/London Street. 51°27′02″N 0°58′01″W) in the Town of Reading, leading by and through the several Parishes of Shinfield and Heckfield, in the several Counties of Berks, Wilts and Southampton, to Basingstoke, in the said County of Southampton. (Repealed by Road from Reading to Basingstoke Act 1801 (41 Geo. 3. (U.K.). c. lix))
Morpeth to Elsdon Road Act 1778	18 Geo. 3. c. 107	16 April 1778
An Act to enlarge the Term and Powers of an Act, passed in the Twenty-fifth Year of the Reign of His late Majesty King George the Second, (Note: Morpeth and Elsdon Road Act 1751 (25 Geo. 2. c. 33)) for repairing the Road leading from the Town of Morpeth, by or through Mitford, Thropple, Long Witton, and by the North Side of Rothley Park Wall to Sting Cross; and to the High Cross in Elsdon, in the County of Northumberland.
Cumberland Roads Act 1778	18 Geo. 3. c. 108	15 May 1778
An Act for continuing and amending an Act, made in the Twenty-sixth Year of the Reign of His late Majesty, (Note: Cumberland Roads Act 1753 (26 Geo. 2. c. 37)) for repairing the Road leading from the Town of Penrith, in the County of Cumberland, by Hutton Hall, over Skelton and Castle Sowerby Pastures and Sebraham Bridge to Chalk Beck, in the said County; and also the Road which branches and separates from the same Road upon Castle Sowerby Pasture aforesaid, and leads from thence through Hesket otherwise Hosket Newmarket, to Caldbeck, in the said County.
Stafford Roads Act 1778 (repealed)	18 Geo. 3. c. 109	15 May 1778
An Act to empower the Trustees for amending the Road from Uttoxeter to Newcastle-under-Lyme, in the County of Stafford, to repair and widen the Road branching out of the said Road at Lower Lane, to the Turnpike Road on Hem Heath, in the same County. (Repealed by Newcastle-under-Lyme Roads Act 1823 (4 Geo. 4. c. li) and Uttoxeter District of Roads Act 1823 (4 Geo. 4. c. lix))
Surrey and Sussex Roads Act 1778 (repealed)	18 Geo. 3. c. 110	15 May 1778
An Act for enlarging the Term and Powers of an Act, passed in the Thirtieth Year of the Reign of His Majesty King George the Second, (Note: Guildford and Arundel Road Act 1757 (30 Geo. 2. c. 60)) for repairing and widening the Road from the North End of Dapdon Wharf, in the Parish of Stoke next Guldeford, through Guldeford to Andrew's Cross, and to Alfold Bars, in the County of Surrey, and from thence to Saint Mary's Gate, in Arundel, in the County of Sussex. (Repealed by Alfold Bars and Newbridge Road Act 1821 (1 & 2 Geo. 4. c. xxxv), Guildford and Alfold Bars Road Act 1829 (10 Geo. 4. c. lxiv) and Annual Turnpike Acts Continuance Act 1867 (30 & 31 Vict. c. 121))
Hereford, Radnor and Salop Roads Act 1778 (repealed)	18 Geo. 3. c. 111	28 May 1778
An Act for continuing the Term of an Act, made in the Twenty-ninth Year of His late Majesty, intituled, "An Act for amending, repairing and widening the Roads leading from the Rye Way, in the Parish of Yarpole, in the County of Hereford, to Presteigne, in the County of Radnor; and from thence to Leintwardine, and from Presteigne aforesaid, to the Top of Trap Hill, and from the Rye Way aforesaid, by the Maidenhead, to Wooferton, in the County of Salop;" (Note: Presteigne Road Act 1756 (29 Geo. 2. c. 94)) and for amending, widening and keeping in Repair, several other Roads branching out of the Roads comprized in the said Act. (Repealed by South Wales Turnpike Trusts Act 1844 (7 & 8 Vict. c. 91))
Northampton Roads Act 1778 (repealed)	18 Geo. 3. c. 112	15 May 1778
An Act for more effectually amending, widening and keeping in Repair, the Roads leading from the Town of Northampton to Chain Bridge, near the Town of Market Harborough, and from the Direction Post in Kingsthorpe, in the County of Northampton, to Welford Bridge, in the said County; and for repealing several Acts made in the Eighth Year of King George the First, (Note: Nottingham and Leicester Highways Act 1721 (8 Geo. 1. c. 13)) and the Twelfth (Note: Northamptonshire Roads Act 1738 (12 Geo. 2. c. 35)) and Twenty-third (Note: Northamptonshire Roads Act 1749 (23 Geo. 2. c. 8)) Years of His late Majesty, relating to the said Roads. (Repealed by Road from Northampton to Chain Bridge Act 1810 (50 Geo. 3. c. cliv))
Keighley to Kirkby Kendal Road Act 1778 (repealed)	18 Geo. 3. c. 113	28 May 1778
An Act for continuing the Term, and altering and enlarging the Powers of an Act, made in the Twenty-sixth Year of the Reign of His late Majesty King George the Second, intituled, "An Act for repairing, amending and widening the Road from Keighley, in the West Riding of the County of York, to Kirkby in Kendal, in the County of Westmorland." (Note: Yorkshire and Westmorland Roads Act 1753 (26 Geo. 2. c. 86)) (Repealed by Keighley to Kirkby Road (Yorkshire District) Act 1823 (4 Geo. 4. c. xlix))
Malmesbury Roads Act 1778 (repealed)	18 Geo. 3. c. 114	10 April 1778
An Act for repairing and widening the Road from Tetbury, in the County of Gloucester, to and through Malmesbury to Chippenham Bridge, in the County of Wilts, and from Malmesbury to the Turnpike Road at or near Jackament's Bottom, in the said County of Gloucester; and also the Road from Farringdon to Cricklade, from thence to Malmesbury, and to the Turnpike Road at Acton Turnville; and also from Sherstone to the Turnpike Road leading from Tetbury to Bath. (Repealed by Roads from Tetbury, Malmesbury, Farringdon and Sherstone Act 1798 (38 Geo. 3. c. lxvi))
Northumberland Roads (No. 2) Act 1778 (repealed)	18 Geo. 3. c. 115	15 May 1778
An Act for repealing an Act made in the Twenty-fifth Year of the Reign of His late Majesty King George the Second, (Note: Northumberland Roads (No. 3) Act 1751 (25 Geo. 2. c. 48)) for repairing and widening the Road leading from a Part of the Road (directed to be repaired by an Act passed in the last Session of Parliament, (Note: Carlisle and Newcastle Road Act 1750 (24 Geo. 2. c. 25)) from Carlisle to Newcastle-upon-Tyne) near Glenwhelt, to another Part of the Road (so making from Carlisle to Newcastle) upon Shildon Common, in the County of Northumberland; and for making more effectual Provision for the Repair of the said Road. (Repealed by Greenhead and Shildon Bar Road and Corbridge Branch Act 1800 (39 & 40 Geo. 3. c. xiv))
Hexham to Alston Road Act 1778 (repealed)	18 Geo. 3. c. 116	15 May 1778
An Act for altering, repairing and widening, the Road from Summer Rods Bar, near the Town of Hexham, in the County of Northumberland, to the Town of Alston, in the County of Cumberland. (Repealed by Hexham and Alston Road Act 1800 (39 & 40 Geo. 3. c. xii))

=== Private acts ===
Short title	Citation	Royal assent
Long title
Robert Cragg Earl Nugent and Charles Townshend's Oaths of Office.	18 Geo. 3. c. 1 Pr.	10 December 1777
An Act to enable the Right Honourable Robert Craggs Earl Nugent, and the Right Honourable Charles Townshend, to take in Great Britain, the Oath of Office, as Vice Treasurer and Receiver General, and Paymaster General of all His Majesty's Revenues in the Kingdom of Ireland, and to qualify themselves for the Enjoyment of the said Offices.
Cantley Inclosure (Amendment) Act 1778	18 Geo. 3. c. 2 Pr.	10 December 1777
An Act for rectifying a Mistake in the Name of One of the Commissioners, appointed to put in Execution an Act made in the last Session of Parliament, (Note: Cantley Inclosure Act 1777 (17 Geo. 3. c. 141 Pr.)) for dividing and enclosing the several Open Common Fields, Meadows, Pastures, Commons, and Waste Grounds, within the Townships of Cantley, Brampton, Bessacarr, and High Ellers, within the several Manors of Brampton and Bessacarr, in the Parish of Cantley, in the West Riding of the County of York.
Popham's Naturalization Act 1778	18 Geo. 3. c. 3 Pr.	10 December 1777
An Act for naturalizing Francis Popham.
Naturalization of John Meyer and Christopher Martens Act 1778	18 Geo. 3. c. 4 Pr.	10 December 1777
An Act for naturalizing John Meyer and Christopher Henry Martens.
Thoyts' Estate Act 1778	18 Geo. 3. c. 5 Pr.	6 March 1778
An Act for vesting certain Messuages, Lands and Hereditaments, in the County of Kent, (Part of the Estates devised and settled by the Will of John Thoyts deceased) in Trustees, to be sold and conveyed to Sir Sampson Gideon Baronet, and his Heirs; and for laying out the Monies arising by such Sale, in the Purchase of other Lands and Hereditaments, to be conveyed and settled to and upon the like Uses and Trust, in the said Will.
Bulwick Inclosure Act 1778	18 Geo. 3. c. 6 Pr.	6 March 1778
An Act for dividing, allotting, and enclosing the Open and Common Fields, Meadows and Common Grounds, within the Parish of Bulwick, in the County of Northampton.
Kimcoate and Walton (Leicestershire) Inclosures Act 1778	18 Geo. 3. c. 7 Pr.	6 March 1778
An Act for dividing and enclosing the Open and Common Fields, Common Pastures, Common Meadows, and other Commonable Lands, in the Liberties of Kimcoate and Walton, in the Parishes of Kimcoate and Knaptoft, in the County of Leicester.
Titchmarsh Inclosure Act 1778	18 Geo. 3. c. 8 Pr.	6 March 1778
An Act for dividing and enclosing the Common and Open Fields, Meadows, Commonable Lands and Waste Grounds, in the Parish of Titchmarsh, in the County of Northampton.
Sapcote Inclosure Act 1778	18 Geo. 3. c. 9 Pr.	6 March 1778
An Act for dividing, allotting and enclosing, the Open Fields, Commons and Waste Grounds, in the Parish, Lordship, and Liberty of Sapcote, in the County of Leicester.
Great Billing Inclosure Act 1778 (repealed)	18 Geo. 3. c. 10 Pr.	6 March 1778
An Act for dividing, allotting and enclosing, the Open and Common Fields, Common Pastures, Common Meadows, Heath, and other Commonable Lands and Grounds, of and within the Manor and Parish of Great Billing, in the County of Northampton. (Repealed by Northampton Act 1988 (c. xxix))
Rushden Inclosure Act 1778	18 Geo. 3. c. 11 Pr.	6 March 1778
An Act for dividing and enclosing the Common and Open Fields, Meadows and Commonable Lands, in the Parish of Rushden, in the County of Northampton.
Bockhampton Inclosure Act 1778	18 Geo. 3. c. 12 Pr.	6 March 1778
An Act for dividing and allotting the Open and Common Fields, Downs and Commonable Grounds, in the Hamlet or Tithing of Bockhampton, in the Parish of Chipping Lambourne, in the County of Berks.
North Dalton Inclosure Act 1778	18 Geo. 3. c. 13 Pr.	6 March 1778
An Act for dividing and enclosing several Open Fields and Stinted Pastures or Waste Grounds, in the Manor of North Dalton, in the East Riding of the County of York.
Long Whatton Inclosure Act 1778	18 Geo. 3. c. 14 Pr.	6 March 1778
An Act for dividing, allotting, and enclosing the Open Fields, and Common or Waste Land, in the Lordship of Long Whatton, in the County of Leicester.
Nazeing Wood or Park Act 1778 (repealed)	18 Geo. 3. c. 15 Pr.	6 March 1778
An Act for regulating the Stocking of a certain Piece of enclosed Pasture Ground called Nazeing Wood or Nazeing Park, in the Manor and Parish of Nazeing, in the County of Essex; and for keeping the Fences thereof in Repair. (Repealed by Nazeing Wood or Park Act 1947 (10 & 11 Geo. 6. c. xxxix))
Clifton upon Calder Inclosure Act 1778	18 Geo. 3. c. 16 Pr.	6 March 1778
An Act for dividing and enclosing the Commons and Waste Grounds, within the Manor of Clifton upon Calder, in the West Riding of the County of York.
Brishington or Busleton Common (Somerset) Inclosure Act 1778	18 Geo. 3. c. 17 Pr.	6 March 1778
An Act for dividing and enclosing the Common or Waste Ground, called Brislington, otherwise Bussleton Common, in the Parish of Brislington, otherwise Bussleton, (Note: Bussleton and Busleton are eighteenth-century spelling variants of Brislington.) in the County of Somerset.
Lathom and Skelmersdale in Ormskirk (Lancashire) Inclosures Act 1778	18 Geo. 3. c. 18 Pr.	6 March 1778
An Act for dividing and enclosing the several Commons and Waste Grounds, within the Manors of Lathom and Skelmersdale, in the Parish of Ormskirk, in the County Palatine of Lancaster.
Isham Inclosure Act 1778	18 Geo. 3. c. 19 Pr.	6 March 1778
An Act for dividing and enclosing the Common and Open Fields, Meadows, Commonable Lands and Waste Grounds, in the Parish of Isham, in the County of Northampton.
Castle Donington Inclosure Act 1778	18 Geo. 3. c. 20 Pr.	6 March 1778
An Act for dividing and enclosing the Open Fields, Meadows and Common Pastures, within the Lordship or Parish of Castle Donington, in the County of Leicester.
Highworth Inclosure Act 1778	18 Geo. 3. c. 21 Pr.	6 March 1778
An Act for dividing and enclosing certain Open and Common Fields, Common Meadows, Common Pastures, and other Commonable and Waste Lands, within the Parish of Highworth, in the County of Wilts.
Head's Name Act 1778	18 Geo. 3. c. 22 Pr.	6 March 1778
An Act to enable Walter James Head Esquire, a Minor, and his Issue, to take and use the Surname of James only, and to bear the Coat Armour of the Family of John James Esquire, deceased.
Wyndham's Name Act 1778	18 Geo. 3. c. 23 Pr.	6 March 1778
An Act for enabling Charles Wyndham Esquire, (now called Charles Edwin), and his Heirs Male, to take and use the Surname of Edwin only.
Naturalization of David Henry De Beanne Act 1778	18 Geo. 3. c. 24 Pr.	6 March 1778
An Act for naturalizing David Henry de Beaune.
Naturalization of Hans Ardwidsso Act 1778	18 Geo. 3. c. 25 Pr.	6 March 1778
An Act for naturalizing Hans Arswidsson.
Naturalization of Charles Frederick Loudonsack Act 1778	18 Geo. 3. c. 26 Pr.	6 March 1778
An Act for naturalizing Charles Frederick Loudonsack.
Naturalization of Henry Wilckens Act 1778	18 Geo. 3. c. 27 Pr.	6 March 1778
An Act for naturalizing Henry Wilckens.
Naturalization of John Deane and Jacob Hippins Act 1778	18 Geo. 3. c. 28 Pr.	6 March 1778
An Act for naturalizing John Christian Dean and Jacob Gottfried Hippius.
Naturalization of James Cazenove Act 1778	18 Geo. 3. c. 29 Pr.	6 March 1778
An Act for naturalizing James Cazenove.
Naturalization of Francis Long Act 1778	18 Geo. 3. c. 30 Pr.	6 March 1778
An Act for naturalizing Francis Long.
Naturalization of Antoine Bazin Act 1778	18 Geo. 3. c. 31 Pr.	6 March 1778
An Act for naturalizing Antoine Bazin.
Lambeth Manor Act 1778	18 Geo. 3. c. 32 Pr.	27 March 1778
An Act to enable the Lord Archbishop of Canterbury to enfranchise and grant a small Parcel of Glebe and Waste Land belonging to the Manor of Lambeth, in the County of Surrey; and also to enable the Rector of the Parish of Saint Mary Lambeth, or his Successors, to build a Parsonage House on Part of the said Glebe and Waste Land, and to grant Building Leases of other Parts thereof; and for other the Purposes therein mentioned.
Earl of Surrey's Estate Act 1778	18 Geo. 3. c. 33 Pr.	27 March 1778
An Act for vesting in the Right Honourable Charles Howard Esquire, commonly called Charles Earl of Surrey, and his Heirs, the Settled Estates of the said Earl, in the Counties of Cumberland, Westmorland and Surrey, subject to certain Charges affecting the same.
Browne's Estate Act 1778	18 Geo. 3. c. 34 Pr.	27 March 1778
An Act for vesting the Timber and Wood growing upon the Estates of Henry Perryn Browne Esquire, in the County of York, in Trustees, to sell the same, and apply the Money arising therefrom for making a Recompence to Sir Richard Perryn his Father, for the Charges and Expences of making Buildings and Improvements upon the same Estate; and for the other Purposes therein mentioned.
Huntspill (Somerset) Rectory Act 1778	18 Geo. 3. c. 35 Pr.	27 March 1778
An Act for annexing a Portion of the Rectory, and of the Rectory Manor thereto belonging, of Huntspill, in the County of Somerset, to the Office of Master of Baliol College in Oxford.
Laughton Manor Act 1778	18 Geo. 3. c. 36 Pr.	27 March 1778
An Act for establishing an Agreement, for discharging the Manor of Laughton, in the County of Leicester, and certain Lands and Hereditaments in the Parish of Laughton, from the Payment of Tithes, or any Modus or Rate for Tithe; and for vesting other Lands and Hereditaments in the Rector of the said Parish, and his Successors, as a Compensation for the said Tithes, and in lieu thereof.
Ogbourn St. Andrew (Wiltshire) Division and Allotment Act 1778	18 Geo. 3. c. 37 Pr.	27 March 1778
An Act for dividing and allotting certain Open and Common Fields, Downs and Commonable Lands or Grounds, in the Tithing of Ogbourn Saint Andrew, in the County of Wilts.
Kegworth Inclosure Act 1778	18 Geo. 3. c. 38 Pr.	27 March 1778
An Act for dividing and enclosing the Open Arable Fields, Open Meadows, Common Pastures and Common Grounds, within the Parish of Kegworth, in the County of Leicester.
Harpole Inclosure Act 1778	18 Geo. 3. c. 39 Pr.	27 March 1778
An Act for dividing, allotting and enclosing, the Open and Common Fields, Common Pastures, Common Meadows, Heath and other Commonable Lands and Grounds, of and within the Parish of Harpole, in the County of Northampton.
Earl Shilton Inclosure Act 1778	18 Geo. 3. c. 40 Pr.	27 March 1778
An Act for dividing, allotting and enclosing, the Open Fields, Meadows and Commons, in the Lordship of Earl Shilton, in the County of Leicester.
Frampton and Hayley (Gloucestershire) Inclosure Act 1778	18 Geo. 3. c. 41 Pr.	27 March 1778
An Act for dividing, allotting and enclosing, the Open Common Fields, Common Pastures, and all other Commonable Lands, in the Tithings of Frampton and Haley, in the Parish of Sapperton, in the County of Gloucester.
Braybrooke Inclosure Act 1778	18 Geo. 3. c. 42 Pr.	27 March 1778
An Act for dividing and enclosing the Open and Common Fields, Common Pastures, Common Meadows and other Commonable Lands and Grounds, of and within the Manor, Parish and Liberties of Braybrooke, in the County of Northampton.
Thimbleby and Edlington (Lincolnshire) Inclosure Act 1778	18 Geo. 3. c. 43 Pr.	27 March 1778
An Act for dividing and enclosing certain Open Fields, Meadows, Ings, Common Pastures and Moors, within the Parishes of Thimbleby and Edlington, in the County of Lincoln.
Assigning certain open and inclosed lands and rights of common within Ripley manor (Yorkshire), pursuant to an agreement between John Ingulby's trustees, Walter Vauafour, Thomas Grimston and Elizabeth Eteson.	18 Geo. 3. c. 44 Pr.	27 March 1778
An Act for assigning certain Open and enclosed Lands and Rights of Common, within the Manor of Ripley, in the County of York, pursuant to an Agreement entered into between the Trustees of John Ingilby Esquire, a Minor, and Walter Vavasour Esquire, Thomas Grimston and Elizabeth Eteson; and for other purposes therein mentioned.
Siddington St. Peter and Siddington St. Mary (Gloucestershire) inclosure, and Rectory Church of St. Mary demolition.	18 Geo. 3. c. 45 Pr.	27 March 1778
An Act for dividing and enclosing the Open Fields, Meadows, Common Pastures and other Commonable Lands, and Grounds, in the Consolidated Parishes of Siddington Saint Peter and Siddington Saint Mary, in the County of Gloucester; and for taking down the Rectory Church of Saint Mary, within the said Parishes.
Hardwicke Inclosure Act 1778	18 Geo. 3. c. 46 Pr.	27 March 1778
An Act for dividing and enclosing the Open and Common Fields, Common Meadows, Common Grounds and Commonable Lands, within the Township and Liberties of Hardwicke, in the County of Buckingham.
Shuckburgh Fields Inclosure Act 1778	18 Geo. 3. c. 47 Pr.	27 March 1778
An Act for dividing and enclosing the Open and Common Fields, Common Meadows and Commonable Lands and Grounds, called Shuckburgh Fields, in the County of Warwick.
North Marston Inclosure Act 1778	18 Geo. 3. c. 48 Pr.	27 March 1778
An Act for dividing and enclosing the Open and Common Fields, and other Commonable Lands and Grounds, of and within the Parish and Liberties of North Marston, in the County of Bucks.
North Mims (Hertfordshire) Common or Wood Inclosure Act 1778	18 Geo. 3. c. 49 Pr.	27 March 1778
An Act for dividing and enclosing the Common or Waste Ground called North Myms Common or Wood, in the Parish of North Myms, in the County of Hertford.
Patney Inclosure Act 1778	18 Geo. 3. c. 50 Pr.	27 March 1778
An Act for dividing, allotting and laying in Severalty, the Open Common Fields, Common Meadows, Common Pastures, Waste Lands and Commonable Places, within the Parish of Patney, in the County of Wilts.
Tacolneston Inclosure Act 1778	18 Geo. 3. c. 51 Pr.	27 March 1778
An Act for dividing, allotting and enclosing the Commons and Waste Lands, within the Parish of Tacolneston, in the County of Norfolk.
Hackthorne Inclosure Act 1778	18 Geo. 3. c. 52 Pr.	27 March 1778
An Act for dividing and enclosing the Open and Common Fields, Common Meadows, Common Pastures, Heath and Waste Lands, within the Manor and Parish of Hackthorne, in the County of Lincoln.
Cow or Chapel Honeyborn (Gloucestershire) Inclosure Act 1778	18 Geo. 3. c. 53 Pr.	27 March 1778
An Act for dividing and enclosing the Open and Common Fields, and all other Commonable Land, in the Manor and Hamlet of Cow Honeyborn, otherwise Chapel Honeyborn, in the County of Gloucester.
Glusburn Moor in Kildwick (Yorkshire, West Riding) Inclosure Act 1778	18 Geo. 3. c. 54 Pr.	27 March 1778
An Act for dividing, allotting and enclosing certain Commons and Waste Grounds, called Glusburn Moor, within the Manor of Glusburn, in the Parish of Kildwick, in the West Riding of the County of York.
Manor of Howden Act 1778	18 Geo. 3. c. 55 Pr.	10 April 1778
An Act for vesting the several yearly Rents and Copyhold Fines, payable to the Lord Bishop of Durham, and his Successors, and issuing out of the several Messuages, Lands and Tenements within the Manor of Howden, in the East Riding of the County of York, in Trustees to be sold; and for enabling the said Lord Bishop of Durham, and his Successors, to enfranchise the several Customary or Copyhold Messuages, Lands and Tenements within the said Manor; and for applying the Money arising from such Sale and Enfranchisement, in the Manner therein mentioned.
Establishing and confirming an agreement between Dean and Chapter of Durham and General Cuthbert Ellison for partition and division of land in Jarrow (Durham).	18 Geo. 3. c. 56 Pr.	10 April 1778
An Act for establishing and confirming an Agreement made between the Dean and Chapter of Durham and General Cuthbert Ellison, for the Partition and Division of a Tract of unimproved Land, in the Parish of Jarrow, in the County Palatine of Durham, and the Partition and Division made in pursuance thereof.
Worsop's Estate Act 1778	18 Geo. 3. c. 57 Pr.	10 April 1778
An Act to enable John Arthur Worsop (heretofore called John Arthur Esquire) to settle a Jointure upon any Woman or Women he may hereafter marry, on the Terms therein mentioned.
Bond's Estate Act 1778	18 Geo. 3. c. 58 Pr.	10 April 1778
An Act to empower John Bond Merchant, and Sarah his Wife, or the Survivor of them, during their respective Lives, to grant Leases of their Settled Estate, in the County of Surrey.
Bullock's Estate Act 1778	18 Geo. 3. c. 59 Pr.	10 April 1778
An Act for vesting the Settled Estate of John Bullock Esquire, and Elizabeth his Wife, in the County of Chester, in Trustees to be sold, for raising Money to discharge an Incumbrance thereon, and laying out the Surplus in the Purchase of Lands and Hereditaments, to be settled to the Uses limited of the said Settled Estate.
Exemplifying George Lord Bingley's will and making it evidence in Great Britain and Ireland.	18 Geo. 3. c. 60 Pr.	10 April 1778
An Act for exemplifying or enrolling the Will of George late Lord Bingley deceased, and making such Exemplification, or attested Copies of the Enrolment thereof, Evidence as well in Ireland as in Great Britain.
Hitcham Inclosure Act 1778	18 Geo. 3. c. 61 Pr.	10 April 1778
An Act for dividing and enclosing the Open and Common Fields, Common Meadows, Common Pastures, Commonable Lands and Waste Grounds, within the Parish and Manor of Hitcham, in the County of Buckingham.
Coate in Bishop's Cannings (Wiltshire) Inclosure Act 1778	18 Geo. 3. c. 62 Pr.	10 April 1778
An Act for dividing, allotting and laying in Severalty, the Open Common Fields, Common Meadows, Common Pastures, Waste Lands and Commonable Places, within the Manor and Tithing of Coate, in the Parish of Bishop's Cannings, in the County of Wilts.
Acomb Common in Hexham (Northumberland) Inclosure Act 1778	18 Geo. 3. c. 63 Pr.	10 April 1778
An Act for dividing and enclosing a certain Common Moor or Tract of Waste Land called Acomb Common, within the Regality or Manor of Hexham, in the County of Northumberland.
Barby Inclosure Act 1778	18 Geo. 3. c. 64 Pr.	10 April 1778
An Act for dividing and enclosing the Open and Common Fields, Common Pastures, Common Meadows and other Commonable Lands and Grounds, of and within the Manor, Parish and Liberties of Barby, in the County of Northampton.
Confirmation of Little Berkford (Bedfordshire) inclosure and exchanges of lands and estates within the parish.	18 Geo. 3. c. 65 Pr.	10 April 1778
An Act for confirming a Division and Enclosure of the Common Fields, Common Meadows, and Common Pastures, within the Parish of Little Berkford, in the County of Bedford, and certain Exchanges of Lands and Estates, within the said Parish.
Kersall Inclosure Act 1778	18 Geo. 3. c. 66 Pr.	10 April 1778
An Act for dividing and enclosing the Open Fields, Meadows, Pastures, Commons and Waste Grounds, in the Townships of Kersall, in the Parish of Kneesall, and County of Nottingham.
Leckhampton and Cheltenham (Gloucestershire) Inclosures Act 1778	18 Geo. 3. c. 67 Pr.	10 April 1778
An Act for dividing and enclosing the Open Common Fields, Common Meadows and Pasture, Waste Grounds, and other Commonable Lands, in the Parish of Leckhampton, in the County of Gloucester, and several small Parcels of the said Fields which extend into the Parish of Cheltenham, in the same County.
Hampstead Norreys Inclosure Act 1778	18 Geo. 3. c. 68 Pr.	10 April 1778
An Act for confirming, establishing and making effectual, certain Articles of Agreement made and entered into for enclosing and dividing the several Commons called Ealing Common, Ealing Green and Cook's Hill, in the Parish of Hampstead Norreys, in the County of Berks; and for exchanging certain Lands in the said Parish.
Napton upon the Hill Inclosure Act 1778	18 Geo. 3. c. 69 Pr.	10 April 1778
An Act for dividing and enclosing the Open and Common Fields, Common Meadows and Commonable Lands and Grounds, within the Parish and Liberties of Napton upon the Hill, in the County of Warwick.
Naturalization of Pierre Theodore De Bruges Act 1778	18 Geo. 3. c. 70 Pr.	10 April 1778
An Act for naturalizing Pierre Theodore de Bruges.
Luttrell's Estate Act 1778	18 Geo. 3. c. 71 Pr.	16 April 1778
An Act to enable the Honourable Temple Simon Luttrell, to make a Jointure upon his intended Wife, out of his Settled Estate, and for making a Provision by Way of Equivalent, in lieu thereof.
Campbell's Divorce Act 1778	18 Geo. 3. c. 72 Pr.	16 April 1778
An Act to dissolve the Marriage of John Hooke Campbell Esquire, with Elizabeth Eustacia his now Wife, and to enable him to marry again; and for other Purposes therein mentioned.
Byfield and Westrup (Northamptonshire) Inclosure Act 1778	18 Geo. 3. c. 73 Pr.	16 April 1778
An Act for dividing and enclosing the Open and Common Fields, Common Pastures, Common Meadows and other Commonable Lands and Grounds, of and within the Manor, Parish and Liberties of Byfield and Westrup, in the Parish of Byfield, in the County of Northampton.
Fenny Compton Inclosure Act 1778	18 Geo. 3. c. 74 Pr.	16 April 1778
An Act for dividing and enclosing the Open and Common Fields, Common Pastures, Common Meadows and other Commonable Lands and Grounds, of and within the Manor, Parish and Liberties of Fenny Compton, in the County of Warwick.
Westhay Moor in Mear (Somerset) Inclosure Act 1778	18 Geo. 3. c. 75 Pr.	16 April 1778
An Act for dividing and enclosing a certain Common or Tract of Commonable Land, called or known by the Name of Westhay Moor, within the Parish of Mear, in the County of Somerset.
Hanslope Inclosure Act 1778	18 Geo. 3. c. 76 Pr.	16 April 1778
An Act for dividing and enclosing the Open and Common Fields, Common Pastures and Common Meadows, within the Parish of Hanslop, in the County of Buckingham.
Northampton Fields Inclosure Act 1778 (repealed)	18 Geo. 3. c. 77 Pr.	16 April 1778
An Act for dividing and enclosing the Open and Common Fields, Common Pastures, Common Meadows and other Commonable Lands and Grounds, within the Parishes of Saint Gyles, Saint Sepulchre, Saint Lawrence and Saint Andrew, in or near the Town of Northampton, in the County of Northampton, some or one of them, and which are commonly called or known by the Name of Northampton Fields. (Repealed by Northampton Act 1988 (c. xxix))
Flore Inclosure Act 1778	18 Geo. 3. c. 78 Pr.	16 April 1778
An Act for dividing and enclosing the Open and Common Fields, Common Pastures, Common Meadows, and other Commonable Lands and Grounds, of and within the Manor, Parish and Liberties of Floore, otherwise Flower, in the County of Northampton.
Sutton's Estate Act 1778	18 Geo. 3. c. 79 Pr.	15 May 1778
An Act for vesting Part of the Settled Estates of Sir Robert Sutton deceased, in the County of Lincoln, in Sir Richard Sutton Baronet, in Fee-Simple; and for vesting certain Lands of the said Sir Richard Sutton, in Easthorpe, in the County of Nottingham, in the Archbishop of York and his Successors, in Fee-Simple, in Exchange for the Mansion House, Park and Lands of the said Sir Richard Sutton, called Norwood Park and Hall Meadow, in the said County of Nottingham, now held by the said Sir Richard Sutton; upon Lease for Lives; and for vesting the same, together with other Lands of the said Sir Richard Sutton, in the County of Nottingham, in lieu of the said Settled Estates.
Wright's Estate Act 1778	18 Geo. 3. c. 80 Pr.	15 May 1778
An Act for carrying into Execution an Agreement entered into by Sir James Wright Baronet, for Sale of the Manor of Husborne Tarrant, and several Woodlands and Hereditaments in the County of Southampton, to Joseph Portal Esquire; and for laying out the Money arising by such Sale, in the Purchase of other Lands and Hereditaments, to be settled to the same Uses.
Champernowne's Estate Act 1778	18 Geo. 3. c. 81 Pr.	15 May 1778
An Act to enable the Reverend Richard Harrington, and the Receiver for the Time being, of the Estates of Arthur Champernowne Esquire, an Infant, to grant Leases and Setts of the same Estates, during his Minority.
Deane's Estate Act 1778	18 Geo. 3. c. 82 Pr.	15 May 1778
An Act for vesting the Settled Estate of Anthony Deane the Younger, Esquire, in the County of Worcester, in Trustees to be sold; and for laying out the Money arising by such Sale, together with other Monies therein mentioned, in the Purchase of other Lands and Hereditaments, to be settled in lieu thereof, to the several Uses therein expressed.
Martin's Estate Act 1778	18 Geo. 3. c. 83 Pr.	15 May 1778
An Act for vesting the Settled Estates of Henry Martin Gentleman, and Elizabeth his Wife, in Elton, in the County of Huntingdon, in Trustees to be exchanged or to be sold, and the Money laid out in the Purchase of other Lands and Hereditaments, to be settled to the same Uses.
Authorizing Sir Lawrence Dundas and others to insert a deed of disposition and conveyance of lands and hereditaments in Scotland, agreed to be settled by articles made prior to Thomas Dundas' marriage to Lady Charlotte, the like power of exchange, as is contained in said settlement, of estates of said Sir Lawrence in England.	18 Geo. 3. c. 84 Pr.	15 May 1778
An Act to authorize Sir Lawrence Dundas Baronet, and the several other Persons therein named, to insert in a Deed of Disposition and Conveyance of Lands and Hereditaments in Scotland, agreed to be settled by Articles made previous to the Marriage of Thomas Dundas Esquire, with Lady Charlotte his Wife, the like Power of Exchange as is contained in the Settlement made previous to the said Marriage, of certain Estates of the said Sir Lawrence Dundas in England.
Campbell's Estate Act 1778	18 Geo. 3. c. 85 Pr.	15 May 1778
An Act for empowering the Judges of the Court of Session in Scotland, to sell such Parts and Portions of the Entailed Estates of Shawfield, and others, in the Counties of Lanark and Argyle, belonging to Walter Campbell of Shawfield Esquire, as shall be sufficient for Payment of the Debts affecting the same.
Bennett's Estate Act 1778	18 Geo. 3. c. 86 Pr.	15 May 1778
An Act for vesting the Settled Estates of Thomas Bennett the Younger, and Elizabeth his Wife, in Trustees, to be conveyed in Exchange for other Estates of greater Value, to be settled to the same Uses.
Gratley Inclosure Act 1778	18 Geo. 3. c. 87 Pr.	15 May 1778
An Act for dividing and allotting certain Open and Common Fields, in the Manor and Parish of Gratley, in the County of Southampton.
Otley and Newall-with-Clifton Inclosure Act 1778	18 Geo. 3. c. 88 Pr.	15 May 1778
An Act for dividing and enclosing certain Commons and Waste Lands, within the Townships of Otley and Newall with Clifton, in the West Riding of the County of York.
Fourstones Common in Langley Inclosure Act 1778	18 Geo. 3. c. 89 Pr.	15 May 1778
An Act for dividing and enclosing a Common Moor or Tract of Waste Ground called Fourstones Common, within the Barony or Manor of Langley, and in the Parish of Warden, in the County of Northumberland.
Saltney Marsh Inclosure Act 1778	18 Geo. 3. c. 90 Pr.	15 May 1778
An Act for dividing, enclosing and preserving a certain Common or Parcel of Waste Ground or Marsh, called Saltney Marsh, within the Manor and Parish of Hawarden, in the County of Flint; and for other the Purposes therein mentioned.
Ollerton Inclosure Act 1778	18 Geo. 3. c. 91 Pr.	15 May 1778
An Act for dividing and enclosing the Commons and Waste Grounds, within the Township of Ollerton, in the Parish of Edwinstow, in the County of Nottingham.
Bolsterstone in Ecclesfield (Yorkshire) Inclosure Act 1778	18 Geo. 3. c. 92 Pr.	15 May 1778
An Act for dividing and enclosing the several Commons and Waste Grounds, within the Manor of Bolsterstone, in the Parish of Ecclesfield, in the County of York.
Naunton Inclosure Act 1778	18 Geo. 3. c. 93 Pr.	15 May 1778
An Act for dividing and enclosing the Open and Common Fields, Hills, Downs, Pastures and Commonable Lands, within the Parish of Naunton, in the County of Gloucester.
Bolsover and Clown (Derbyshire) Inclosure Act 1778	18 Geo. 3. c. 94 Pr.	15 May 1778
An Act for dividing and enclosing the Open Arable Fields and Commons, within the Manor of Bolsover, in the Parishes of Bolsover and Clown, in the County of Derby.
Dinnington Inclosure Act 1778	18 Geo. 3. c. 95 Pr.	15 May 1778
An Act for dividing and enclosing certain Open Fields, Meadow, Carr, Common and Waste Ground, within the Township of Dinnington, in the Parishes of Saint Leonard and Saint John, in the County of York.
Bolnhurst Inclosure Act 1778	18 Geo. 3. c. 96 Pr.	15 May 1778
An Act for dividing and enclosing certain Open and Common Fields, and Commonable Lands and Grounds, within the Manor and Parish of Bolnhurst, in the County of Bedford; and for exonerating certain ancient Enclosures within the said Manor and Parish, from the Payment of Tythes.
Ruskington Inclosure Act 1778	18 Geo. 3. c. 97 Pr.	15 May 1778
An Act for dividing and enclosing the Open Common Fields, Meadow Grounds, Common Fen, Cow Pasture, and other Commonable Lands, in the Parish of Ruskington, in the County of Lincoln.
Northowram in Halifax (Yorkshire) Inclosure Act 1778	18 Geo. 3. c. 98 Pr.	15 May 1778
An Act for dividing and enclosing the Commons and Waste Grounds, within the Township of Northowram, in the Parish of Halifax, in the County of York.
Maidford Inclosure Act 1778	18 Geo. 3. c. 99 Pr.	15 May 1778
An Act for dividing and enclosing the Open and Common Fields, Common Pastures, Common Meadows, Common Grounds, Heath and Waste Grounds, of and within the Parish of Maidford, in the County of Northampton.
Wootton Inclosure Act 1778 (repealed)	18 Geo. 3. c. 100 Pr.	15 May 1778
An Act for dividing, allotting and enclosing, the Open and Common Fields, Common Pastures, Common Meadows, and other Commonable Lands and Grounds, of and within the Parish and Liberties of Wootton, in the County of Northampton. (Repealed by Northampton Act 1988 (c. xxix))
Rouslench and Radford (Worcestershire) Inclosures Act 1778	18 Geo. 3. c. 101 Pr.	15 May 1778
An Act for dividing and enclosing the Open and Common Fields, Common Meadows, Common Pastures, Common Ground and Waste Grounds, within the Manors or Lordships of Rouslench and Radford, in the Parish of Rouslench, in the County of Worcester.
Blake's Divorce Act 1778	18 Geo. 3. c. 102 Pr.	15 May 1778
An Act to dissolve the Marriage of Sir Patrick Blake Baronet, with Dame Annabella Blake his now Wife, and to enable him to marry again; and for other Purposes therein mentioned.
Darby's Divorce Act 1778	18 Geo. 3. c. 103 Pr.	15 May 1778
An Act to dissolve the Marriage of Thomas Darby Clerk, with Mary his Wife, and to enable him to marry again; and for other Purposes therein mentioned.
Degen's Divorce Act 1778	18 Geo. 3. c. 104 Pr.	15 May 1778
An Act to dissolve the Marriage of George Christopher Degen, with Catherine Furlong his now Wife, and to enable him to marry again; and for other Purposes therein mentioned.
Dobbin's Divorce Act 1778	18 Geo. 3. c. 105 Pr.	15 May 1778
An Act to dissolve the Marriage of Clotworthy Dobbin Esquire, with Mary his now Wife, and to enable him to marry again; and for other Purposes therein mentioned.
Edmund Bunney's Name Act 1778	18 Geo. 3. c. 106 Pr.	15 May 1778
An Act to enable Edmund Hartopp lately called Edmund Bunney) Esquire, and the Heirs of his Body by Ann his Wife, to take and use the Surname and bear the Arms of Hartopp.
Naturalization of Court Henry Dirs Act 1778	18 Geo. 3. c. 107 Pr.	15 May 1778
An Act for naturalizing Court Henry Dirs.
Naturalization of Phillippe Besnard Act 1778	18 Geo. 3. c. 108 Pr.	15 May 1778
An Act for naturalizing Philippe Besnard.
Keck's Estates Act 1778	18 Geo. 3. c. 109 Pr.	28 May 1778
An Act concerning certain Estates heretofore of Francis Keck Esquire deceased, in the Counties of Oxford and Wilts, (that is to say) for vesting such Part thereof which hath been sold under a Decree and subsequent Order of the Court of Chancery, in Trustees, to enable them to convey the same; and for carrying into Execution an Agreement concerning other Parts of such Estates; and for confirming and carrying into Execution a Partition made pursuant to the said Decree and subsequent Order, of so much of the said Estates as remain unsold; and for vesting Part of such Estates in Diana Mary Barker and her Heirs, subject to the Trusts in the Will of Francis Baber Esquire deceased, and the Residue in Trustees to be sold; and for directing the Application of the Money which shall arise by such Sale; and for other Purposes therein mentioned.
Blackwood's Estate Act 1778	18 Geo. 3. c. 110 Pr.	28 May 1778
An Act for vesting certain Messages, Lands, Tenements and Hereditaments, in the Parish of Crayford, in the County of Kent, comprized in the Marriage Settlement of Shovel Blackwood and Sarah his Wife, in Trustees, to the several Uses within mentioned; and also for vesting certain other Messages, Lands, Tenements and Hereditaments, in the Parishes of Norborn, Betshanger, Ham, Sholdon and Poultons, in the said County of Kent, called Poulton Farm, and West Street and Park Gate Farm, entailed upon the Issue Male of the said Shovel Blackwood, in other Trustees, to the several Uses within mentioned.
Bridges' Estate Act 1778	18 Geo. 3. c. 111 Pr.	28 May 1778
An Act for vesting in Trustees, certain Messuages, Lands and Tenements in the County of Surrey, settled in and by the Will of Thomas Bridges Esquire, deceased, to be sold and conveyed pursuant to Articles; and for laying out the Purchase Money in other Lands and Tenements, to be settled to the Uses of the said Will.
St. John and St. Benedict in Glastonbury (Somerset) Inclosure Act 1778	18 Geo. 3. c. 112 Pr.	28 May 1778
An Act for dividing, allotting, enclosing and draining, certain Moors or Pieces of Waste Land, within the Parishes of Saint John and Saint Benedict, in Glastonbury, in the County of Somerset.
Rumball's Name Act 1778	18 Geo. 3. c. 113 Pr.	28 May 1778
An Act to enable James Rumball, now called James Quilter, his First and other Sons, and their Heirs Male, to take and use the Surname, and bear the Coat Armour of Quilter, in pursuance of the Will of James Quilter, Esquire, deceased.

== Bibliography ==
=== Sources ===
- Pickering, Danby, ed. (1778). "18 George III - 1777-8". The Statutes at Large. Vol. 32. Cambridge: Charles Bathurst – via Google Books.
- Journals of the House of Commons. Vol. 36. London: His Majesty's Stationery Office. 1803. pp. 541–1007 – via Google Books.
- Chronological Table of and Index to the Statutes. Vol. 1: To the End of the Session 59 Vict. Sess. 2 (1895) (13th ed.). London: Her Majesty's Stationery Office. 1896. pp. 134–135 – via Google Books.

== See also ==
- List of acts of the Parliament of Great Britain
