= Taromeo =

- Suburb
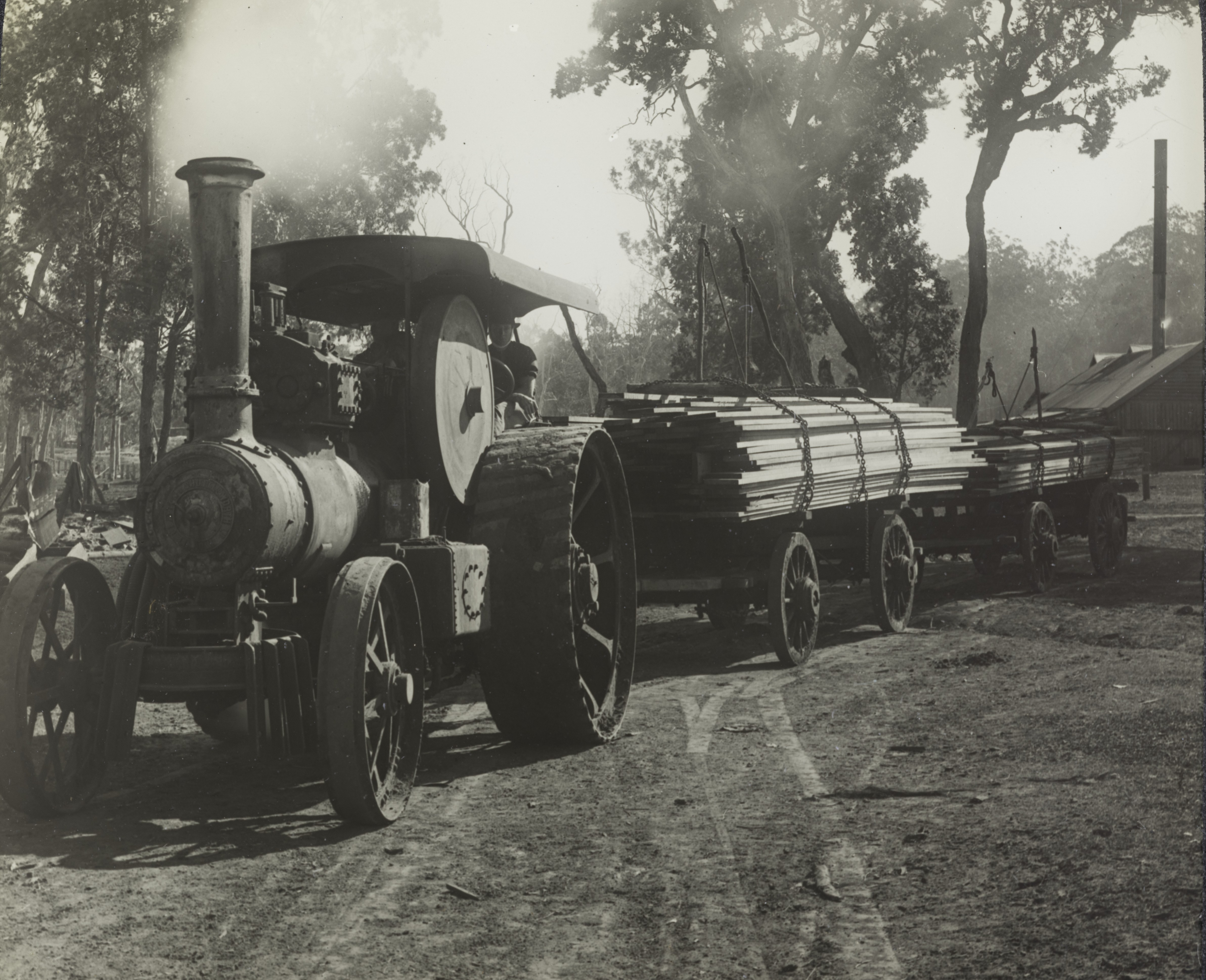
- Hauling sawn timber from the Forest Service sawmill by steam roller, Taromeo

- Interactive map of Taromeo
- Coordinates: 26.8177°S 152.1330°E
- Country: Australia
- State: Queensland
- LGA: South Burnett Region
- Location: 7.9 km (4.9 mi) N of Blackbutt; 43.0 km (26.7 mi) SE of Yarraman; 67.4 km (41.9 mi) SE of Kingaroy; 110 km (68 mi) N of Toowoomba; 164 km (102 mi) NW of Brisbane
- Established: 1877

Government
  - State electorate: Nanango
  - Federal division: Maranoa

Area
  - Total: 87.2 km^{2} (33.7 sq mi)

Population
  - Total: 373 (2021 census)
  - Density: 4.278/km^{2} (11.079/sq mi)
- Time zone: UTC+10:00 (AEST)
- Postcode: 4314
Suburbs around Taromeo
Teelah	East Nanango	Avoca Vale
Yarraman	Taromeo	Linville
Nukku; Blackbutt North	Benarkin North	Moore

Taromeo is a rural locality in the South Burnett Region, Queensland, Australia. In the 2021 census, Taromeo had a population of 373 people.

== Geography ==
Most of the east of the locality is within the Benarkin State Forest which extends into neighbouring Linville and Moore. Apart from this protected area, the land use is a mixture of rural residential housing and grazing on native vegetation.

== History ==
The locality presumably takes its name from the surrounding parish of Tarameo, which in turn takes its name from the Taromeo pastoral station which was named in 1842 by Simon Scott. It is probably a corruption of the Waka language word tarum meaning wild lime tree.

Taromeo was opened for selection on 17 April 1877; 14,500 acres (5,900 ha) were available.

Taromeo State School opened on 18 October 1909 on a 5-acre (2.0 ha) site. In 1924, it had an enrolment of 26 students. It closed on 1 February 1942 as there was no accommodation for the teacher. It was on the eastern side of Old Esk Road (approx 26.8431°S 152.16379°E).

Taromeo Soldiers' Settlement State School opened in November 1934. It closed on 19 March 1944. Despite its name, the school was on the northern side of Greenwood Creek Road in present-day East Nanango (approx 26.69400°S 152.03489°E).

On 1 February 2018, Taromeo's postcode changed from 4306 to 4314.

== Demographics ==
In the 2016 census, Taromeo had a population of 335 people.

In the 2021 census, Taromeo had a population of 373 people.

== Education ==
There are no schools in Taromeo. The nearest government primary schools are Blackbutt State School in Blackbutt to the south, Benarkin State School in Benarkin to the south, and Nanango State School in Nanango to the north-west. The nearest government secondary schools are Yarraman State School (to Year 9) in neighbouring Yarraman to the west and Nanango State High School (to Year 12) in Nanango.
