= Colinton War Memorial =

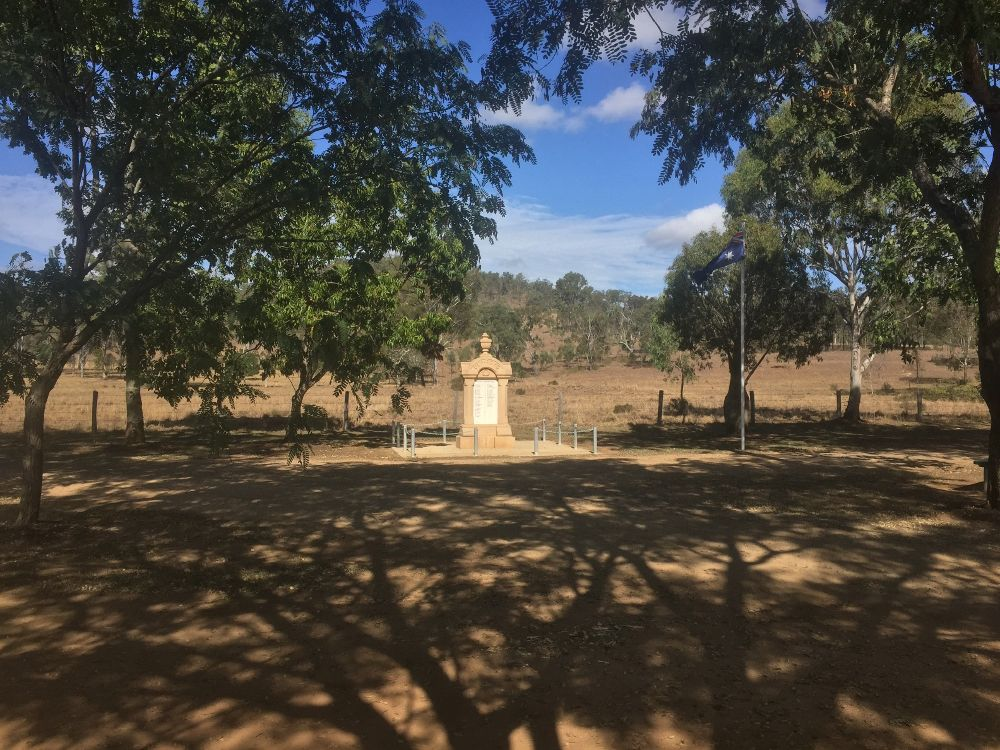
- Colinton War Memorial, 2016

- Location within Queensland
- 26.9304°S 152.3230°E
- Location: corner of D'Aguilar Highway and Emu Creek Road, Colinton, Somerset Region, Queensland, Australia

History
- Design period: 1914–1919 (World War I)
- Built: 1917

Site notes
- Architectural style: Classicism

Queensland Heritage Register
- Official name: Colinton War Memorial
- Type: state heritage
- Designated: 15 July 2016
- Reference no.: 650029
- Type: Monuments and Memorials: Memorial/Monument – war
- Theme: Maintaining order: Defending the country

Colinton War Memorial is a heritage-listed war memorial at the corner of the D'Aguilar Highway and Emu Creek Road, Colinton, Somerset Region, Queensland, Australia. It was built in 1917. It was added to the Queensland Heritage Register on 15 July 2016.

== History ==
The Colinton War Memorial (1917), located in road reserve on the southwestern corner of Emu Creek Road and the D'Aguilar Highway at Colinton in the upper Brisbane Valley, is a sandstone and marble memorial to the men of Colinton and district who served during World War I (WWI). This stone memorial board by well-known monumental masons F Williams and Co. is the earliest WWI memorial monument known to be erected in Queensland. It is important in demonstrating Queensland's involvement in a major world event and has a special association with the upper Brisbane Valley community.

The upper Brisbane Valley was settled by squatters in the 1840s and was initially used for depasturing sheep, but later for cattle. Colinton Run, taken up by the Balfour Brothers (John, Charles and Robert) in 1841, included the site of Colinton War Memorial. The original Colinton Station was made up of six leases: Colinton East and West, Mt Stanley East, Mt Stanley West, Diaper and Altyre, comprising covered 336,000 acres (136,000 ha).

Closer settlement in the Brisbane Valley began in the 1870s. Colinton Run was reduced when the resumption of 94,080 acres (38,070 ha) from Colinton East and West took place in 1876. As a result of land clearance by the selectors in the upper Brisbane Valley, a timber industry flourished, with one of the first sawmills being established at Colinton in the 1870s.

Sufficient settlement of the Brisbane Valley had taken place by 1877 for inspection of the land for a rail route from Walloon, via Esk and Nanango, to Gympie. The first section of the Brisbane Valley railway line, to Lowood, opened on 16 June 1884 while the second section, to Esk, opened on 9 August 1886; where the terminus remained for 17 years. During the 1880s closer settlement of the Brisbane Valley intensified with more land resumed from pastoral stations and settled. Further reduction of Colinton Station took place in 1904 when the Colinton Estate was sold as 145 farms ranging from 100–3,648 acres (40–1,476 ha) in size and suitable for dairying and agriculture.

Dairy farming had commenced in the Brisbane Valley in the late 19th century, aided by the advancing Brisbane Valley railway line, which transported farm produce to dairy factories. The first of these was established at Lowood in 1890.

As a result of closer settlement, the township of Colinton formed as a service town for its surrounding agricultural community. In the Queensland Post Office Directory of 1900, three people were listed as residents of Colinton. In 1907 Colinton Provisional School opened nearby in Emu Creek Road, and T H Moore of nearby Colinton Station helped establish the Standard Dairy Company Limited condensery, when he presented the company with its factory site at Colinton.

The Standard Dairy Company became a well-known condensed milk producer in Queensland early in the 20th century and played an important role in the settlement and progress of the Colinton district. It had opened a condensed milk factory at Wyreema on the Darling Downs before 1906. Its second factory opened at Colinton on 15 February 1908, located on the north bank of Emu Creek beside the main road between Kilcoy and Blackbutt. The company stated that "thousands of pounds have been invested in the building and plant [and the condensery was] one of the most complete, largest, and fully equipped in the Commonwealth... capable of treating 10,000 gallons of milk per day". The condensed milk factory made "Prairie" milk from the district's dairy produce. From December 1909, nearby Nurinda railway station loaded goods to and from the factory.

At the outbreak of WWI, Colinton was a growing township. In that year, 27 people were listed there for postal purposes, of which 22 were dairy farmers. The 1911 census for Colinton district had recorded a population of 213. The Standard Dairy Co. Ltd's condensery in the township received the produce of about 44 dairy farmers and provided employment at the factory for at least 40 locals. Photographic evidence of Colinton from 1914 and 1915 shows: about a dozen houses; two stores; and a School of Arts (1911–12), which was located north of Emu Creek, opposite the condensery.

Given its population of a little over 200, Colinton's enlistment response was substantial. By January 1917, 44 Colinton men had successfully enlisted in the Australian Imperial Force (AIF).

The plan to establish Colinton War Memorial to recognise their war service was initiated in May 1916. "[A] meeting was held to decide in what way to best place on record the excellent response the district has made to the call of the Empire, there having been 46 [sic] good men accepted for service from Colinton and the surrounding district. It has been practically decided to erect a marble slab, bearing the names of those who have volunteered". In August 1916 Joseph H Frisby, secretary of the Colinton Honour Board Committee, was granted permission by the Esk Shire Council to erect an honour board at the Colinton School of Arts, which was the social hub of the town and district, where meetings, dances, balls, and send-offs and memorials for soldiers were held.

On 18 January 1917, the Colinton Honour Board (now known as the Colinton War Memorial) was unveiled by the local member of parliament, Henry Plantagenet Somerset, Member of the Queensland Legislative Assembly. The stone honour board was located directly in front of the Colinton School of Arts, facing north.

Colinton War Memorial is the earliest WWI memorial of the monument type known to have been erected in Queensland. At the time of its unveiling, the memorial was "believed to be the first of its kind in the state". The stone honour board was described as follows:

"[t]he base, pillars and crown are of sandstone, the centre being of white marble, on which are inscribed the names of the volunteers."

'It is between 10 and 11 feet in height [3-3.3 m], the slab in the centre being marble, and the rest sandstone. The cost was subscribed by the residents of Colinton (Queensland)."

No state government other than Victoria's made direct grants for local WWI memorials except for the building of halls, hospitals and schools which were eligible for public money whether or not they were memorials. Fund-raising for local war memorials was thus a voluntary community effort, as was the case at Colinton.

The decision about whose names should appear on a war memorial varied across Australia. While some only listed the dead, many also listed those who returned from service. War memorial committees were also lobbied to consider including people who missed military service for various reasons. In Colinton's case, the memorial was created to honour all the men of their community who volunteered to serve, and they were affectionately called "Our Boys" on the memorial.

WWI memorials took a variety of forms in Australia, including honour boards (from 1915), stone monuments (including obelisks, soldier statues, arches, crosses, columns, urns, or slabs - such as the one at Colinton), tree-lined memorial avenues, memorial parks, and utilitarian structures such as gates, halls and clocks. In Queensland the "digger" statue was the most popular choice of monument, while the obelisk predominated in southern states. Australia's first permanent WWI memorial to honour the men from a particular community was unveiled at Balmain in Sydney, New South Wales on 23 April 1916.

The Colinton War Memorial was designed and executed by Frank Williams, of F Williams and Co. monumental stone masons, of East & Limestone Streets, Ipswich. Frank Williams was a well-known and respected monumental mason whose firm operated from 1901 until 1945. The firm was noted for ecclesiastical marble work and supplied memorials throughout Queensland. It was responsible for about 15 war memorials in southeast Queensland and was also commissioned to create 179 headstones for the graves of WWI soldiers and sailors throughout Queensland. Frank Williams' reputation as a monumental mason was such that well-known sculptor Daphne Mayo learnt the art of carving from him in 1919, prior to travelling to London on Queensland's first traveling art scholarship.

Like all Australian communities, Colinton was affected by the impact of WWI. Of the 330,770 Australians who embarked for overseas service in WWI, 58,961 died and 170,909 were wounded, went missing or became prisoners of war. This meant that around 69% of embarked personnel became casualties - or 21% of eligible Australian males. To date, no previous or subsequent war has had such an impact on Australia in terms of loss of life; almost every community in every Australian state lost young people. Even before the end of hostilities, memorials were being erected by Australian communities to honour local people who had served and/or died. These memorials were a spontaneous and highly visible means of honouring those who served and expressing national grief; substitute graves for the Australians whose bodies lay in battlefield cemeteries in Europe and the Middle East.

The Colinton War Memorial lists 43 men who enlisted from the district, although 44 had enlisted. Of these, only 13 returned to Colinton or its adjacent districts at the end of WWI and in 1922 only five of these were still working in the district.

Following WWI, enormous change occurred at Colinton. The Standard Dairy Company Limited announced in December 1919 that its Colinton condensery would be moved to Nerang. However, in August 1920 it was reported as still operating at Colinton. The move was completed by June the following year, when Nestlé and Anglo-Swiss Condensed Milk Co. (Australia) Ltd was formed to acquire the Australasian business of Nestle and Anglo-Swiss Condensed Milk Company, as well as Bacchus Marsh Concentrated Milk Co. Pty Ltd, the Standard Dairy Co. Ltd (with factories at Wyreema, Wellcamp and Nerang) and Australian Milk Products Ltd. The Nestle Company condensery at Toogoolawah took over the Colinton factory's milk supply.

The closing down of the Colinton condensery impacted upon the township. In 1919–20 there were 37 residents listed for Colinton in the Queensland Post Office Directory. Despite the continuation of dairying as an important industry in the Brisbane Valley, the 1933 census showed a decline in the Colinton district's population to 181.

The decline of dairy farming dates from the 1950s as factories closed and dairymen turned to cattle production. After World War II dairy production in Queensland followed the national shift from cream, butter and cheese production to the supply of pasteurized bulk milk, made possible by improvements to rural roads and in road transportation. Stricter regulations for the running of dairies, lower prices, the loss of the British market, and foreign imports also took their toll. Many farmers either switched to bulk milk production or left the dairy industry altogether.

By the 1950s there were only a few homes and businesses left at Colinton. This decline was no doubt exacerbated by the re-alignment of the Brisbane Valley Highway (now D'Aguilar Highway) in the late 1950s further to the south of that part of the township lying southeast of Emu Creek. By 1971 there were no houses left in the township, although a general store operated beside the re-aligned highway.

Following the 1974 flood - which did not affect the Colinton War Memorial, but did result in upgrading of the adjacent highway - the Esk Shire Council relocated the war memorial from its site near Emu Creek to its current position in the road reserve at the corner of Emu Creek Road and the D'Aguilar Highway.

Today the locality of Colinton has a service station on the southern side of the highway and the Colinton Memorial Park, where the Colinton War Memorial stands. The Colinton area and the neighbouring town of Moore have a combined population of about 315. Colinton War Memorial, although lacking a surrounding township, is the focus of occasional community commemorations and is recognised and visited by passing motorists travelling the adjacent D'Aguilar Highway. It has been the subject of artistic rendition by well-known photographer, Richard Stringer and artist, Lyn Felman.

== Description ==
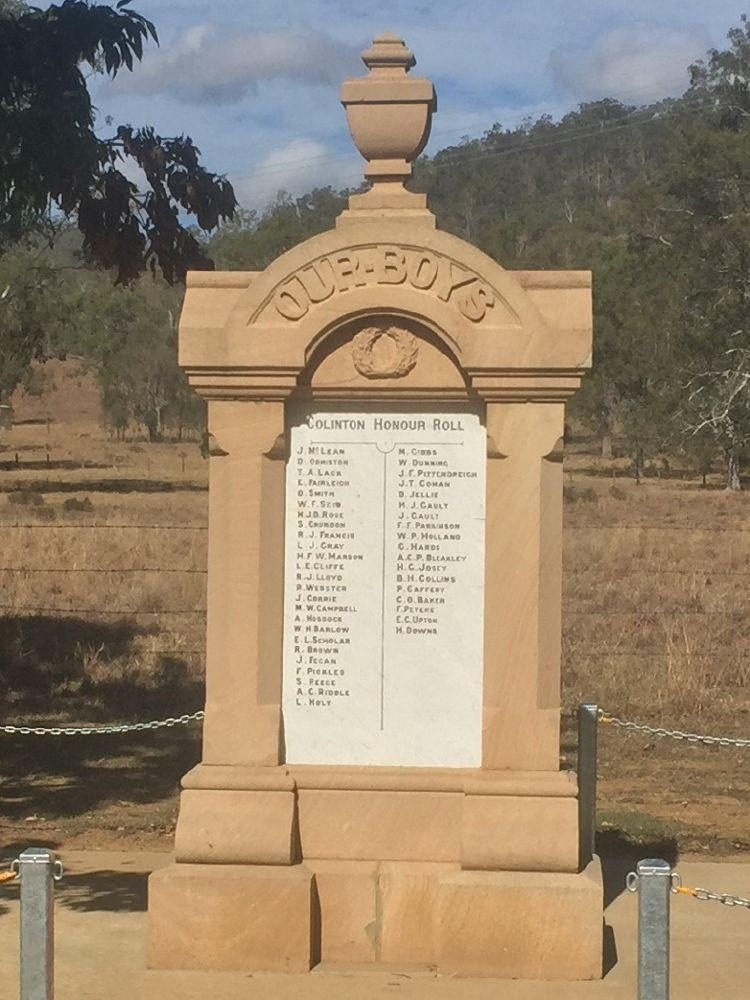
Colinton War Memorial, 2016

The Colinton War Memorial is located within Colinton Memorial Park, a triangular shaped 0.3 hectares (0.74 acres) (approx.) area on the corner of D'Aguilar Highway (to the northeast) and Emu Creek Road (to the northwest), at Colinton, in the upper Brisbane Valley. The open park setting contains grassed areas and shade trees of various species, and is bounded to the south by paddocks. Set back from the intersection, the memorial is orientated east-west and faces north.

The memorial stands approximately three metres high and comprises a white marble panel framed by a carved sandstone base, columns and aedicule.

The moulded, stepped base is I-shaped in plan and has bevelled corners. The square columns are stop-chamfered and flank the marble panel, which is visible from two sides. The front of the panel reads "COLINTON HONOUR ROLL" and lists the names of 43 men from the district who served in WWI, in two columns (25 on the left and 18 on the right) roughly in the order they enlisted.

The decorative aedicule has a moulded cornice and is mirrored on the north and south faces. It comprises an arched pediment with the inscription "OUR BOYS" above a laurel wreath set within the tympanum, and a gabled ridge, which is capped with an edge roll and terminates with tracery infills above the columns. The aedicule is topped with an urn that has bevelled corners.

The modern concrete slab, flagpole, metal posts and chains surrounding the memorial are not heritage-listed.

== Heritage listing ==
Colinton War Memorial was listed on the Queensland Heritage Register on 15 July 2016 having satisfied the following criteria.

The place is important in demonstrating the evolution or pattern of Queensland's history.

The Colinton War Memorial, unveiled in 1917, is important in demonstrating Queensland's involvement in a major world event. World War I (WWI) memorials are a tribute from a particular community to those who served and those who died. They are an important feature of Queensland's towns and cities and are also important in demonstrating a common pattern of commemoration across Queensland and Australia.

The stone honour board at Colinton is the first WWI memorial monument known to be erected in Queensland.

The place is important in demonstrating the principal characteristics of a particular class of cultural places.

The Colinton War Memorial is a good example of a well-designed and finely crafted WWI memorial. Designed and built by monumental stone masons Frank Williams & Co., its decorative treatments include classical references typical of WWI memorials and symbolising honour (columns), death (urn) and mourning (wreath).

It is a rare and early example of a stone honour board in Queensland and a fine example of the work of the well-regarded Queensland firm of monumental masons, Frank Williams & Co.

The place is important because of its aesthetic significance.

Colinton War Memorial is of aesthetic significance for its high level of workmanship, materials and design.

Standing alone in a rural landscape without evidence of the community that created it, Colinton War Memorial evokes a sense of loss of both the soldiers it commemorates and their township.

The place has a strong or special association with a particular community or cultural group for social, cultural or spiritual reasons.

The Colinton War Memorial, funded by community subscription, has a strong and special association with the people of the upper Brisbane Valley. Commemorations at the Colinton War Memorial reflect the wider reverence felt for war memorials across Australia, as a focus of reflection and tribute.

== See also ==
- World War I memorials in Queensland
