= Anduramba, Queensland =

Anduramba
- Town
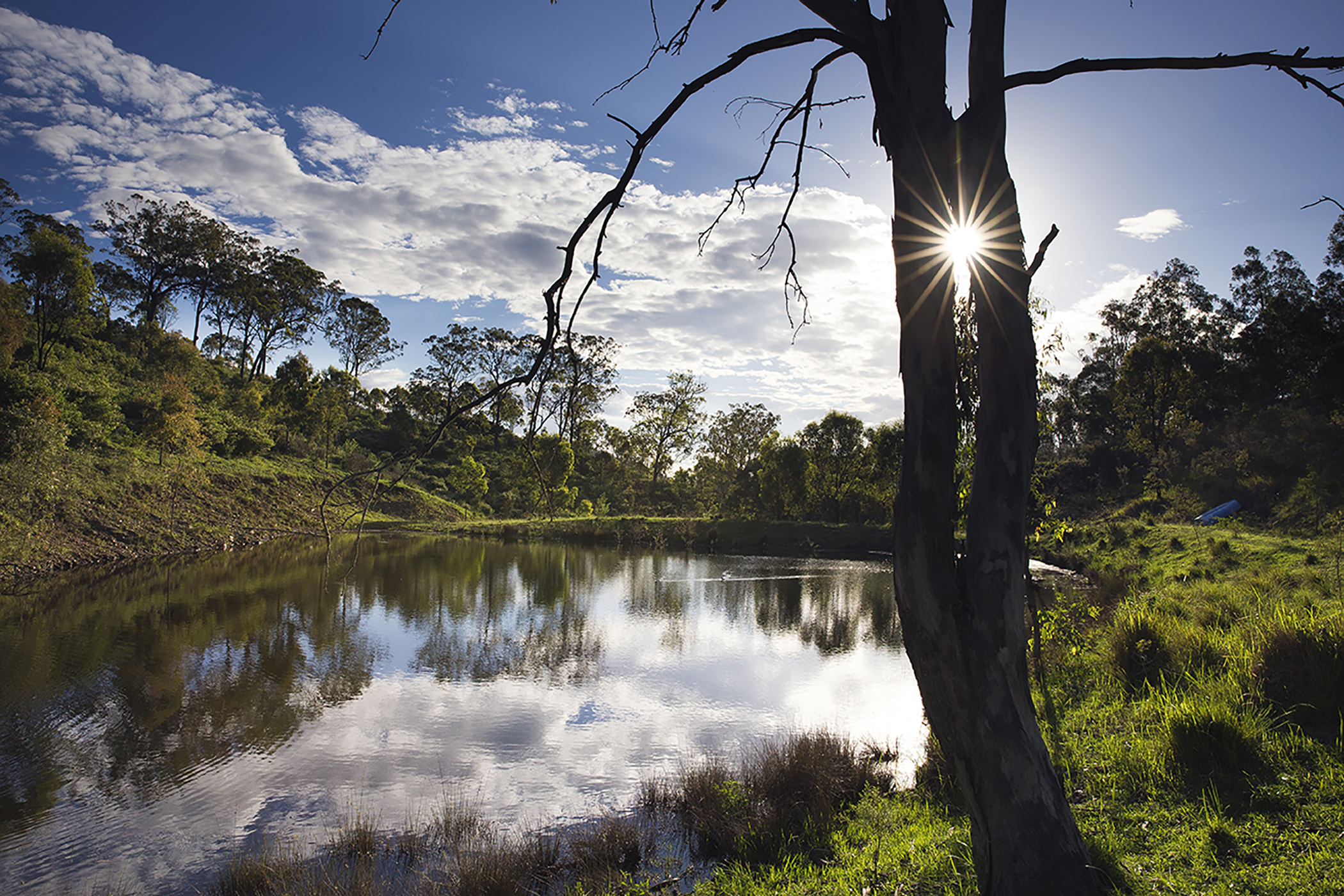
- Dam at Anduramba, 2017

- Interactive map of Anduramba
- Coordinates: 27.07°S 152.1191°E
- Country: Australia
- State: Queensland
- LGA: Toowoomba Region
- Location: 15.7 km (9.8 mi) NNE of Crows Nest; 37.1 km (23.1 mi) W of Toogoolawah; 47.2 km (29.3 mi) NNE of Highfields; 60.2 km (37.4 mi) NNE of Toowoomba; 143 km (89 mi) NW of Brisbane

Government
  - State electorate: Nanango
  - Federal division: Maranoa

Area
  - Total: 283.6 km^{2} (109.5 sq mi)

Population
  - Total: 84 (2021 census)
  - Density: 0.2962/km^{2} (0.767/sq mi)
- Time zone: UTC+10:00 (AEST)
- Postcode: 4355
- Mean max temp: 22 °C (72 °F)
- Mean min temp: 10 °C (50 °F)
- Annual rainfall: 800 mm (31 in)
Localities around Anduramba
Googa Creek	Cherry Creek	Colinton
Emu Creek	Anduramba	Harlin
Pierces Creek	Crows Nest; The Bluff	Eskdale

Anduramba is a rural locality in the Toowoomba Region, Queensland, Australia. In the 2021 census, Anduramba had a population of 84 people.

== Geography ==
The northeast of the locality is marked by Emu Creek, a tributary of the Brisbane River.

== History ==
Anduramba State School opened in 1912. It closed in 1952, but re-opened in 1953. It closed permanently on 18 October 1959. The school was in McGreevy Road (27.1436°S 152.0947°E).

Anduramba was officially named and bounded as a locality in February 1999. The boundaries were amended in September 2005 to include the locality of Nudindenda.

== Demographics ==
In the 2016 census, Anduramba had a population of 77 people.

In the 2021 census, Anduramba had a population of 84 people.

== Education ==
There are no schools in Anduramba. The nearest government primary schools are Crow's Nest State School in neighbouring Crows Nest to the south, Blackbutt State School in Blackbutt to the north-west, and Benarkin State School in Benarkin to the north. The nearest government secondary schools are:

- Crow's Nest State School (to Year 10) in Crows Nest to the south
- Highfields State Secondary College (to Year 12) in Highfields to the south-west
- Yarraman State School (to Year 9) in Yarraman to the north-west
- Nanango State High School (to Year 12) in Nanango to the north
- Toogoolawah State High School (to Year 12) in Toogoolawah to the east

Some parts of Anduramba are too distant from any secondary school for a daily commute. The alternatives are distance education and boarding school.
