= Benarkin North, Queensland =

Benarkin North
- Suburb
- Interactive map of Benarkin North
- Coordinates: 26.8552°S 152.1497°E
- Country: Australia
- State: Queensland
- LGA: South Burnett Region
- Location: 9.7 km (6.0 mi) NE of Blackbutt; 47.5 km (29.5 mi) SE of Nanango; 69.2 km (43.0 mi) SE of Kingaroy; 159 km (99 mi) NW of Brisbane

Government
  - State electorate: Nanango
  - Federal division: Maranoa

Area
  - Total: 12.3 km^{2} (4.7 sq mi)

Population
  - Total: 341 (2021 census)
  - Density: 27.72/km^{2} (71.8/sq mi)
- Time zone: UTC+10:00 (AEST)
- Postcode: 4314
Suburbs around Benarkin North
Taromeo	Taromeo	Taromeo
Taromeo	Benarkin North	Taromeo
Blackbutt North; Benarkin	Moore	Moore

Benarkin North is a rural locality in the South Burnett Region, Queensland, Australia. In the 2021 census, Benarkin North had a population of 341 people.

== Geography ==
The land use is a mix of rural residential and grazing on native vegetation.

== History ==
The locality name Benarkin takes its name from ''Benarqui'' from the Dungibara language which refers to the blackbutt tree (Eucalyptus pilularis) which is common in the district.

On 1 February 2018, Benarkin North's postcode changed from 4306 to 4314.

== Demographics ==
In the 2016 census, Benarkin North had a population of 316 people.

In the 2021 census, Benarkin North had a population of 341 people.

== Education ==
There are no schools in Benarkin North. The nearest government primary school is Benarkin State School in neighbouring Benarkin to the south. The nearest government secondary schools are Yarraman State School (to Year 9) in Yarraman to the west and Nanango State High School (to Year 12) in Nanango to the north-west.
