= Gilla, Queensland =

Gilla
- Suburb
- Interactive map of Gilla
- Coordinates: 26.9130°S 152.0180°E
- Country: Australia
- State: Queensland
- LGA: Toowoomba Region
- Location: 29.0 km (18.0 mi) S of Nanango; 53.4 km (33.2 mi) SE of Kingaroy; 101 km (63 mi) N of Toowoomba CBD; 158 km (98 mi) NW of Brisbane

Government
  - State electorate: Nanango
  - Federal division: Maranoa

Area
  - Total: 88.9 km^{2} (34.3 sq mi)

Population
  - Total: 61 (2021 census)
  - Density: 0.686/km^{2} (1.777/sq mi)
- Time zone: UTC+10:00 (AEST)
- Postcode: 4314
Suburbs around Gilla
Yarraman	Yarraman	Nukku
Upper Yarraman; Kooralgin	Gilla	Blackbutt South
Kooralgin	Mount Binga	Googa Creek

Gilla is a rural locality in the Toowoomba Region, Queensland, Australia. In the 2021 census, Gilla had a population of 61 people.

== Geography ==
Gilla is loosely bounded to the south-east by the Blackbutt Range (26.9333°S 152.0166°E), exending into neighbouring localities of Blackbutt South, Googa Creek, Mount Binga and beyond.

Pidna is a neighbourhood on the northern edge of the locality (26.8666°S 152.0166°E).

The Pockets is a neighbourhood near the south-eastern edge of the locality (26.9166°S 152.05°E).

The north-west of the locality is a protected area within the Pidna National Park (26.8914°S 151.9711°E) and the Pidna State Forest (26.8747°S 151.9869°E). The south-east of the locality is a protected area within the Googa State Forest (26.9227°S 152.0291°E) which extending into neighbouring Googa Creek.

Apart from the protected areas, the predominant land use is grazing on native vegetation.

The D'Aigular Highway enters the locality from the north-east (Nukku) and exits to the north (Yarraman).

The former Brisbane Valley railway line entered the locality from the north-east (Nukka) just to the south-east of the highway and exited to the north (Yarraman) immediately to the east of the highway. Gilla railway station is an abandoned railway station on the railway line in the north of the locality (26.8777°S 152.0393°E).

The Ted Pukallus Weir is a dam structure on Cooyar Creek to create a water reservoir to supply drinking water to the Yarraman area.

== History ==
The locality takes its name from the former Gilla railway station name which was named on 19 December 1912 using an Aboriginal word from the Wakawaka language, Bujiebara dialect, meaning native bee.

Pidna is a Yuggera and/or Waka language word meaning ear.

Ninety-three (93) Mile Camp Provisional School opened in 1912. In 1913, it was renamed Gilla Provisional School. It closed circa 1922.

The Ted Pukallus Weir was originally completed in 1967. It was badly damaged in the 2011 Queensland floods and required $9.5M worth of repairs which were completed in 2013.

On 1 February 2018, Gilla's postcode changed from 4306 to 4314.

== Demographics ==
In the 2016 census, Gilla had a population of 32 people.

In the 2021 census, Gilla had a population of 61 people.

== Education ==
There are no schools in Gilla. The nearest government primary schools are Yarraman State School in neighbouring Yarraman to the north-east and Blackbutt State School in Blackbutt to the east. The nearest government secondary schools are Yarraman State School (to Year 9) and Nanango State High School (to Year 12) in Nanango to the north.

== Economy ==
There are a number of homesteads in the locality, including:

- Blackbird (26.8766°S 152.0621°E)
- Bunyips Rest (26.8725°S 152.0580°E)
- Gilla (26.8787°S 152.0374°E)
- Gwydillion (26.8755°S 152.0588°E)
- Waterfall Creek (26.8991°S 152.0404°E)
- Wattle Creek (26.8769°S 152.0435°E)

== Attractions ==
The Ted Pukallus Weir on Gilla Road (26.8742°S 152.0261°E) is a popular fishing spot.
