= Cherry Creek, Queensland =

Cherry Creek
- Suburb
- Interactive map of Cherry Creek
- Coordinates: 26.9266°S 152.1144°E
- Country: Australia
- State: Queensland
- LGA: Toowoomba Region
- Location: 6.2 km (3.9 mi) S of Blackbutt; 40.8 km (25.4 mi) SSE of Nanango; 101 km (63 mi) NNE of Toowoomba CBD; 166 km (103 mi) NW of Brisbane

Government
  - State electorate: Nanango
  - Federal division: Maranoa

Area
  - Total: 28.5 km^{2} (11.0 sq mi)

Population
  - Total: 38 (2021 census)
  - Density: 1.333/km^{2} (3.45/sq mi)
- Time zone: UTC+10:00 (AEST)
- Postcode: 4314
Suburbs around Cherry Creek
Blackbutt South	Blackbutt South	Benarkin
Googa Creek	Cherry Creek	Moore
Googa Creek	Anduramba	Colinton

Cherry Creek is a rural locality in the Toowoomba Region, Queensland, Australia. In the 2021 census, Cherry Creek had a population of 38 people.

== Geography ==
Cherry Creek takes its name from Cherry Creek which rises within the locality and flows through it, becoming a tributary of Emu Creek, forming the south-eastern boundary of the location and flowing into the Brisbane River.

== History ==
On 1 February 2018, Cherry Creek's postcode changed from 4306 to 4314.

== Demographics ==
In the 2016 census, Cherry Creek had a population of 49 people.

In the 2021 census, Cherry Creek had a population of 38 people.

== Education ==
There are no schools in Cherry Creek. The nearest government primary schools are Blackbutt State School in Blackbutt to the north and Benarkin State School in neighbouring Benarkin to the north-east. The nearest government secondary schools are Yarraman State School (to Year 9) in Yarraman to the north-west and Nanango State High School (to Year 12) in Nanango to the north.
