= Nukku =

- Suburb
- Interactive map of Nukku
- Coordinates: 26.8677°S 152.0802°E
- Country: Australia
- State: Queensland
- LGA: South Burnett Region
- Location: 15.9 km (9.9 mi) E of Yarraman; 36.9 km (22.9 mi) SSE of Nanango; 60.6 km (37.7 mi) SE of Kingaroy; 104 km (65 mi) N of Toowoomba; 170 km (110 mi) NW of Brisbane

Government
  - State electorate: Nanango
  - Federal division: Maranoa

Area
  - Total: 14.6 km^{2} (5.6 sq mi)

Population
  - Total: 40 (2021 census)
  - Density: 2.7/km^{2} (7.1/sq mi)
- Time zone: UTC+10:00 (AEST)
- Postcode: 4314
Suburbs around Nukku
Yarraman	Taromeo	Blackbutt North
Gilla	Nukku	Blackbutt
Gilla	Blackbutt South	Blackbutt South

Nukku is a rural locality in the South Burnett Region, Queensland, Australia. In the 2021 census, Nukku had a population of 40 people.

== Geography ==
The D'Aguilar Highway passes through the south of the locality from west (Blackbutt) to east (Gilla).

The land use is grazing on native vegetation.

== History ==
The locality takes its name from the Nukku railway station name, assigned on 19 December 1912 by the Queensland Railways Department. It is an Aboriginal word (Waka language, Dungibara dialect, Koolaburra clan), meaning watershed.

The Brisbane Valley railway line from Benarkin via Blackbutt and Nukku to Gilla opened on 19 December 1912. Nukku was served by the Nukku railway station (26.8805°S 152.0684°E). The line closed in 1993. The station building was relocated to Millar Street in Yarraman to be used as a workshop for a saddlery business and, in 2015, relocated to Blackbutt as a museum exhibit.

Nukku State School opened on 28 May 1928. It closed in 1967. The school was located to the south of the D'Aguilar Highway near the Nukka Road Road junction (approx 26.8811°S 152.06555°E). The former school building was relocated to Blackbutt to house the Roy Emerson Museum.

On 1 February 2018, Nukku's postcode changed from 4306 to 4314.

== Demographics ==
In the 2016 census, Nukku had a population of 22 people.

In the 2021 census, Nukku had a population of 40 people.

== Education ==
There are no schools in Nukku. The nearest government primary school is Blackbutt State School in neighbouring Blackbutt to the east. The nearest government secondary schools are Yarraman State School (to Year 10) in neighbouring Yarraman to the north-west and Nanango State High School (to Year 12) in Nanango to the north.

== Notable residents ==
Tennis champion Roy Emerson attended Nukku State School for his early education.
