= Boobir Dam =

Dam in Queensland, Australia

- Interactive map of Boobir Dam
- Official name: Boobir Creek Dam
- Country: Australia
- Location: Blackbutt, Wide Bay–Burnett, Queensland
- Coordinates: 26.8864°S 152.091°E
- Purpose: Water supply
- Status: Completed
- Operator: South Burnett Regional Council

Dam and spillways
- Impounds: Boobir Creek

Reservoir
- Total capacity: 179 ML (6.3×10^{6} cu ft)
- Surface area: 0.05 ha (0.12 acres)
- Maximum length: 400 m (1,300 ft)
- Maximum width: 125 m (410 ft)

The Boobir Creek Dam is a relatively small dam that supplies the town water supply for Blackbutt, in the Wide Bay–Burnett area of Queensland, Australia.

== Overview ==
The dam is owned and managed by the South Burnett Regional Council (until 2008, by Nanango Shire Council) to provide a safe, reliable water supply for Blackbutt. Tourist facilities are not provided and the road into the dam is locked.

During the early 2000s drought, Boobir Creek Dam ran nearly dry, and Nanango Shire Council called for urgent tenders to complete a pipeline from Wivenhoe Dam. The project was haltered after years of good, flooding rain due to the state-wide storms in 2008, the floods in 2011, and Cyclone Oswald in 2013.

== See also ==
- List of dams and reservoirs in Australia
