= Googa Creek =

- Suburb
- Interactive map of Googa Creek
- Coordinates: 26.9633°S 152.0552°E
- Country: Australia
- State: Queensland
- LGA: Toowoomba Region
- Location: 13.7 km (8.5 mi) SSW of Blackbutt; 26.1 km (16.2 mi) SE of Yarraman; 47.1 km (29.3 mi) S of Nanango; 96.3 km (59.8 mi) N of Toowoomba; 170 km (110 mi) NW of Brisbane

Government
  - State electorate: Nanango
  - Federal division: Maranoa

Area
  - Total: 73.2 km^{2} (28.3 sq mi)

Population
  - Total: 54 (2021 census)
  - Density: 0.738/km^{2} (1.911/sq mi)
- Time zone: UTC+10:00 (AEST)
- Postcode: 4314
Suburbs around Googa Creek
Gilla	Blackbutt South	Cherry Creek
Mount Binga	Googa Creek	Anduramba
Emu Creek	Emu Creek	Anduramba

Googa Creek is a rural locality in the Toowoomba Region, Queensland, Australia. In the 2021 census, Googa Creek had a population of 54 people.

== History ==
Googa Googa Creek State School opened on 9 May 1921 and closed in 1950. It was located at approximately 26.9550°S 152.0430°E to the west of Googa Googa Creek within the present-day Googa State Forest.

A telephone service for Googa Creek was approved in 1947.

On 1 February 2018, Googa Creek's postcode changed from 4306 to 4314.

== Demographics ==
In the 2016 census, Googa Creek had a population of 43 people.

In the 2021 census, Googa Creek had a population of 54 people.

== Education ==
There are no school in Googa Creek. The nearest government primary school is Blackbutt State School in Blackbutt to the north-east. The nearest government secondary schools are Yarraman State School (to Year 9) in Yarraman to the north-west and Nanango State High School (to Year 12) in Nanango to the north.
