= Blackbutt South =

- Suburb
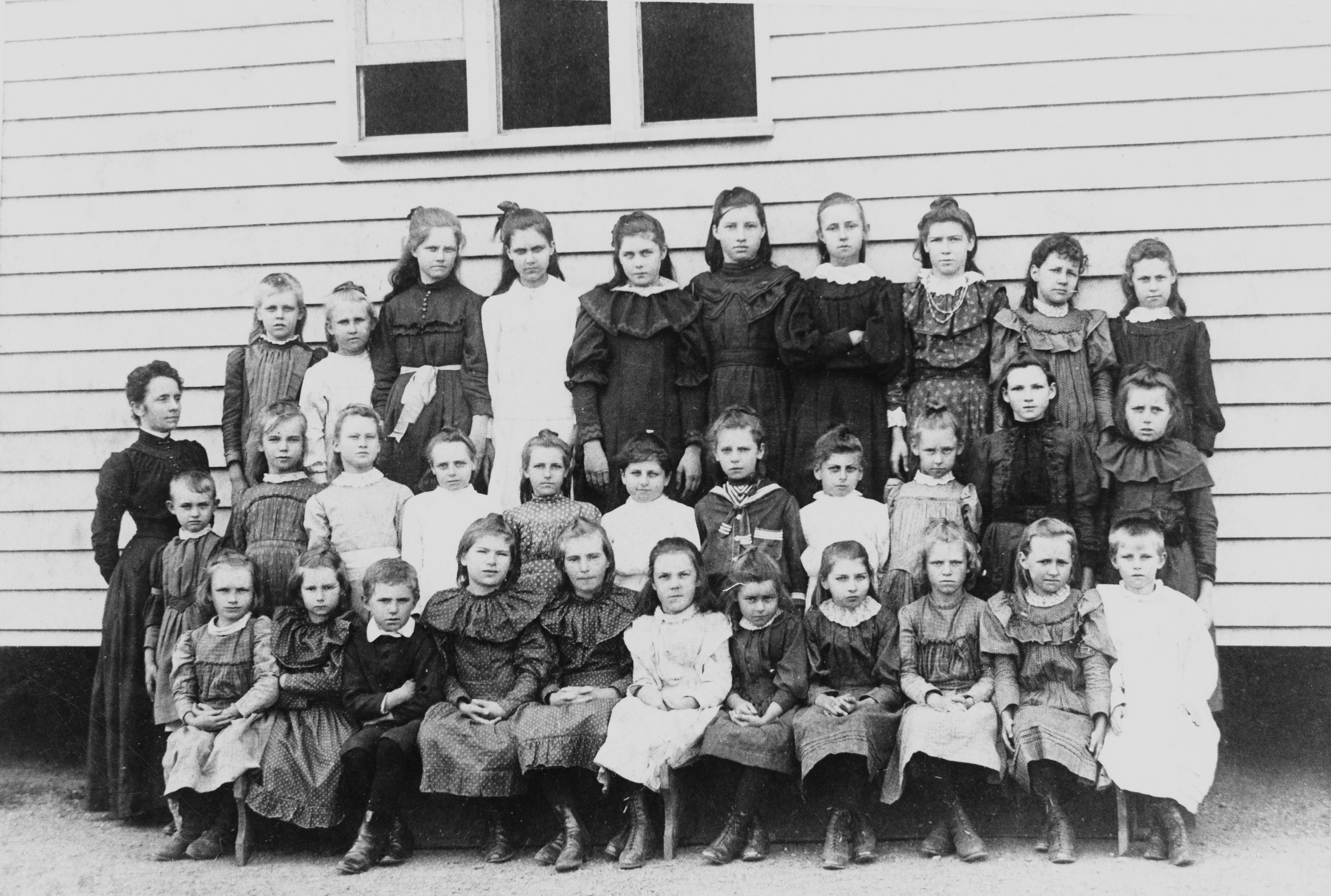
- Pupils of the Blackbutt State School with their teacher, circa 1912

- Interactive map of Blackbutt South
- Coordinates: 26.9066°S 152.0830°E
- Country: Australia
- State: Queensland
- LGA: South Burnett Region
- Location: 36.8 km (22.9 mi) SSE of Nanango; 61.3 km (38.1 mi) SE of Kingaroy; 100 km (62 mi) N of Toowoomba; 162 km (101 mi) NW of Brisbane

Government
  - State electorate: Nanango
  - Federal division: Maranoa

Area
  - Total: 14.9 km^{2} (5.8 sq mi)

Population
  - Total: 160 (2021 census)
  - Density: 10.7/km^{2} (27.8/sq mi)
- Time zone: UTC+10:00 (AEST)
- Postcode: 4314
Suburbs around Blackbutt South
Nukku	Blackbutt	Benarkin
Gilla	Blackbutt South	Cherry Creek
Gilla	Googa Creek	Googa Creek

Blackbutt South is a rural locality in the South Burnett Region, Queensland, Australia. In the 2021 census, Blackbutt South had a population of 160 people.

== Geography ==
As its name suggests, the locality is immediately south of the town and locality of Blackbutt. The north-east of the locality (closest to Blackbutt) is rural residential housing, but most of the land use in the locality is a mixture of crop growing and grazing on native vegetation.

== History ==
Blackbutt Provisional School opened on 20 January 1896 under teacher Rosa Bella Ryan. On 1 January 1909, it became Blackbutt State School. The school was on a 6-acre-1-rood (2.5 ha) site at 97 Blackbutt Crows Nest Road in present-day Blackbutt South (south-east corner of Haynes Kite Millar Road, 26.9011°S 152.0994°E). In 1912, school daily attendance was between 60 and 70 students, leading to a petition from parents to build a new school in a more central location. In January 1914, the school relocated to its current larger site in Blackbutt.

On 1 February 2018, Blackbutt South's postcode changed from 4306 to 4314.

== Demographics ==
In the 2016 census, Blackbutt South had a population of 169 people.

In the 2021 census, Blackbutt South had a population of 160 people.

== Education ==
There are no schools in Blackbutt South. The nearest government primary school is Blackbutt State School in neighbouring Blackbutt to the north. The nearest government secondary schools are Yarraman State School (to Year 9) in Yarraman to the north-west and Nanango State High School (to Year 12) in Nanango to the north.
