= Blackbutt North =

- Suburb
- Interactive map of Blackbutt North
- Coordinates: 26.865°S 152.115°E
- Country: Australia
- State: Queensland
- LGA: South Burnett Region
- Location: 3.5 km (2.2 mi) N of Blackbutt; 39.3 km (24.4 mi) SE of Nanango; 64 km (40 mi) SE of Kingaroy; 168 km (104 mi) NW of Brisbane

Government
  - State electorate: Nanango
  - Federal division: Maranoa

Area
  - Total: 12.3 km^{2} (4.7 sq mi)

Population
  - Total: 451 (2021 census)
  - Density: 36.67/km^{2} (95.0/sq mi)
- Time zone: UTC+10:00 (AEST)
- Postcode: 4314
Suburbs around Blackbutt North
Taromeo	Taromeo	Taromeo
Nukku	Blackbutt North	Benarkin North
Blackbutt	Blackbutt	Benarkin

Blackbutt North is a rural locality in the South Burnett Region, Queensland, Australia. In the 2021 census, Blackbutt North had a population of 451 people.

== Geography ==
The land use is predominantly rural residential, extending from the town of Blackbutt to the south.

== History ==
On 1 February 2018, Blackbutt North's postcode changed from 4306 to 4314.

== Demographics ==
In the 2016 census, Blackbutt North had a population of 438 people.

In the 2021 census, Blackbutt North had a population of 451 people.

== Education ==
There are no schools in Blackbutt North. The nearest government primary schools are Blackbutt State School in neighbouring Blackbutt to the south and Benarkin State School in neighbouring Benarkin to the south-east. The nearest government secondary schools are Yarraman State School (to Year 9) in Yarraman to the west and Nanango State High School (to Year 12) in Nanango to the north-west.
