= Colinton, Queensland =

Colinton
- Suburb
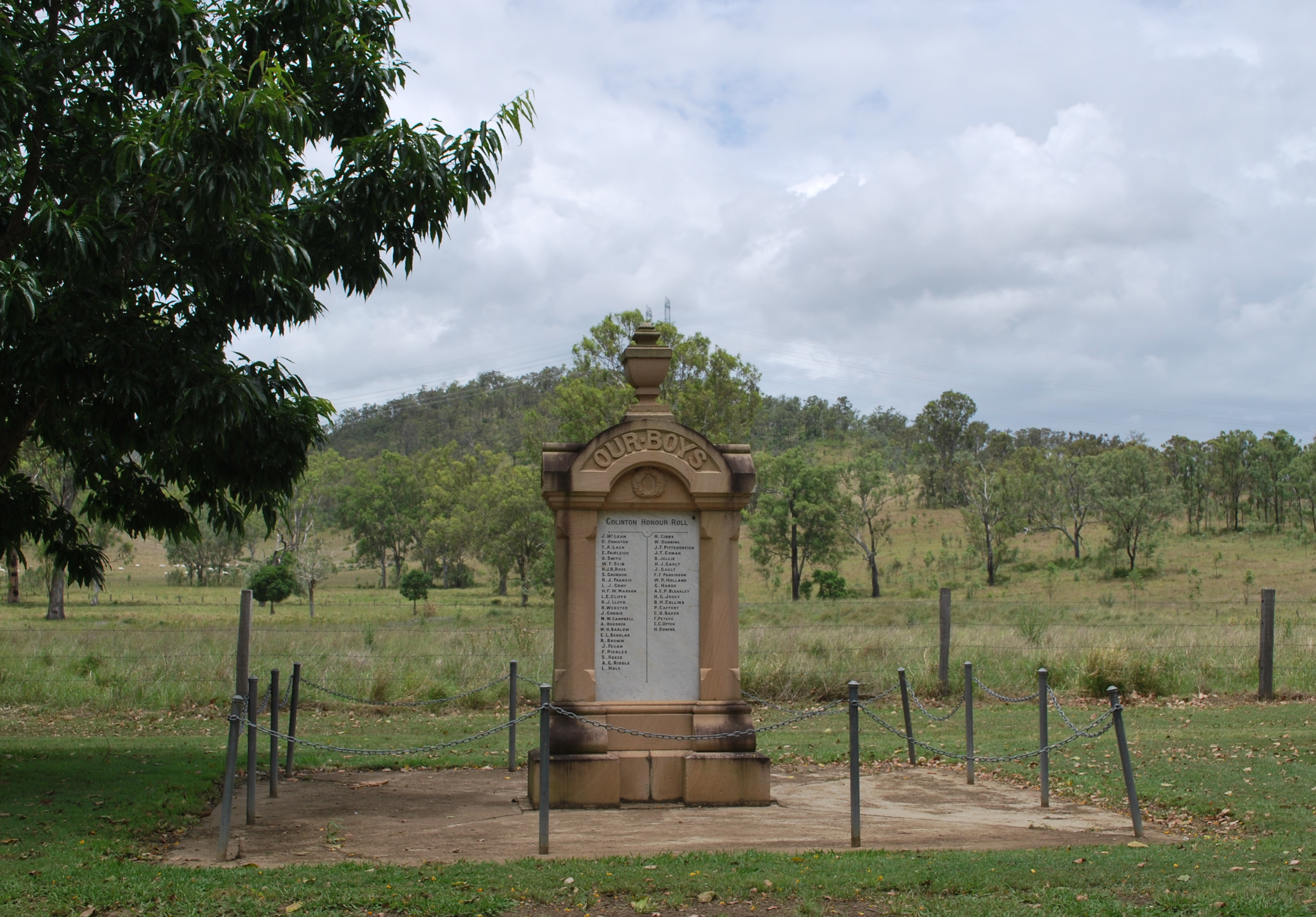
- Colinton War Memorial, 2010

- Interactive map of Colinton
- Coordinates: 26.9316°S 152.3261°E
- Country: Australia
- State: Queensland
- LGA: Somerset Region
- Location: 21.4 km (13.3 mi) N of Toogoolawah; 38.9 km (24.2 mi) N of Esk; 124 km (77 mi) NW of Brisbane

Government
  - State electorate: Nanango
  - Federal division: Blair

Area
  - Total: 139.9 km^{2} (54.0 sq mi)

Population
  - Total: 60 (2021 census)
  - Density: 0.43/km^{2} (1.11/sq mi)
- Time zone: UTC+10:00 (AEST)
- Postcode: 4314
Suburbs around Colinton
Cherry Creek	Moore	Harlin
Cherry Creek	Colinton	Harlin
Anduramba	Harlin	Harlin

Colinton is a rural locality in the Somerset Region, Queensland, Australia. In the 2021 census, Colinton had a population of 60 people.

== Geography ==
Colinton lies within the water catchment area of Emu Creek, a tributary of the Brisbane River. The creek marks a portion of both the southern and western boundary and the Brisbane River is aligned with the eastern boundary. The D'Aguilar Highway passes through the east where the Brisbane Valley railway line also once passed. Benarkin State Forest roughly covers the western third of Colinton.

Colinton has the following mountains:

- Glenhowden Mountain in the east of the locality (26.9801°S 152.2671°E), rising to 366 metres (1,201 ft)
- Mount Calabash in the south of the locality (27.0133°S 152.2296°E), rising to 429 metres (1,407 ft)

== History ==
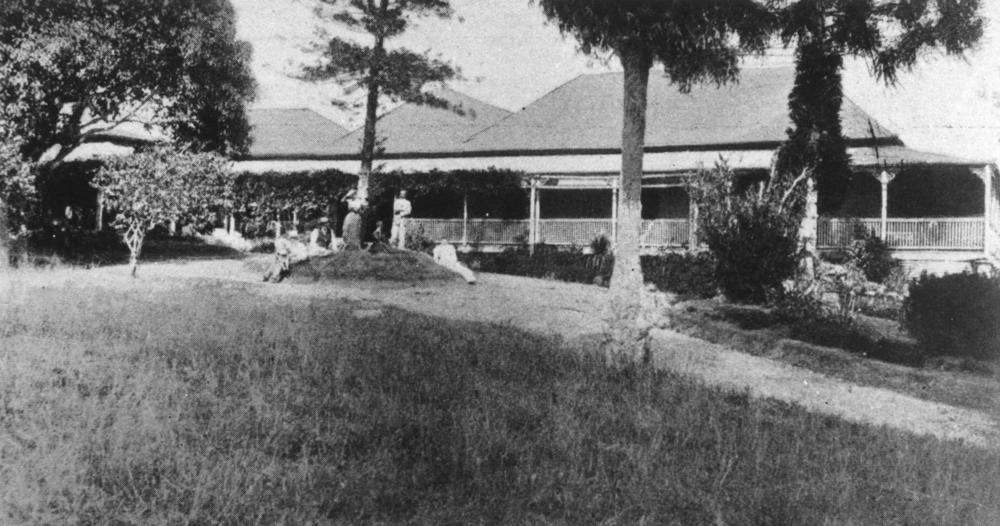
House at Colinton pastoral run, 1904

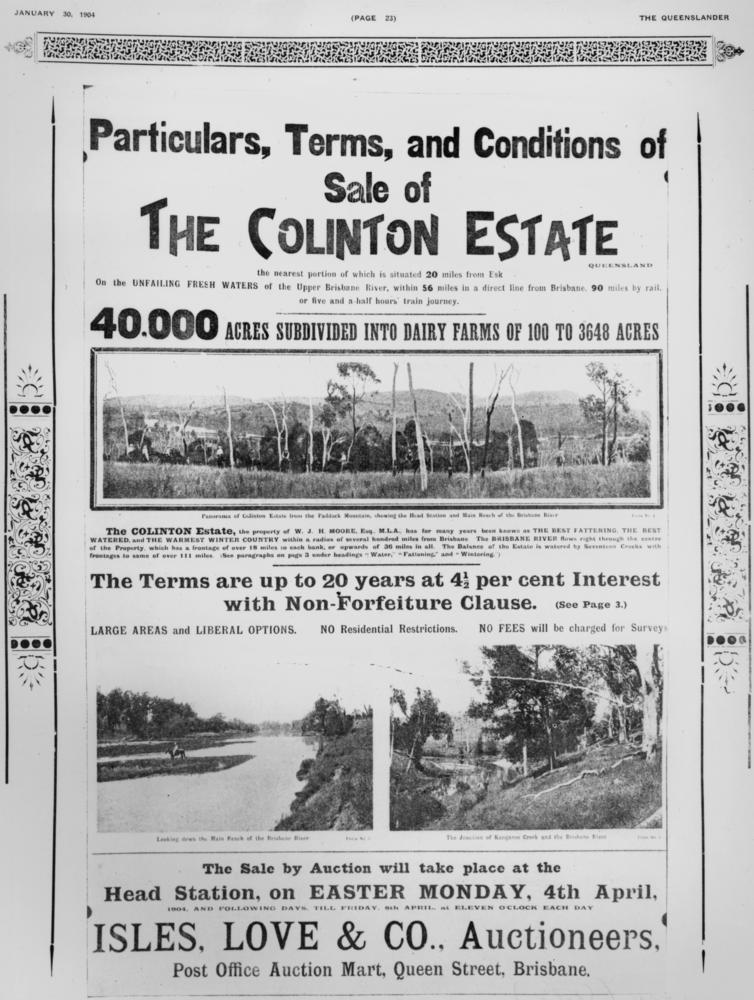
Land sales for Colinton, 1904

The district takes its name from the pastoral run owned by the Balfour family which was in turn named for their home town in Colinton, Lothian, Scotland.

In 1877, 23,000 acres (9,300 ha) were resumed from the Colinton pastoral run and offered for selection on 19 April 1877.

Colinton Provisional School opened in 1879 but closed in early 1880. It reopened in 1906 and on 1 January 1909 became Colinton State School. It closed in 1969. It was on Emu Creek Road (26.9333°S 152.3171°E).

On 22 November 1910, the Brisbane Valley railway line opened its fifth stage from Toogoolawah to Linville via Colinton, which was served by the Nurinda railway station (26.9306°S 152.3351°E). The Brisbane Valley railway ceased operations in 1993.

The Colinton War Memorial was unveiled outside the School of Arts on 18 January 1917 by Member of the Queensland Legislative Assembly for Stanley, Henry Plantagenet Somerset. The 1974 flood of the Brisbane River did not affect the Colinton War Memorial, but resulted in changes to the highway. As part of these changes, the Esk Shire Council relocated the war memorial to its current position in the road reserve at the corner of Emu Creek Road and the D'Aguilar Highway.

On 1 February 2018, Colinton's postcode changed from 4306 to 4314.

== Demographics ==
In the 2011 census, Colinton was included within the neighbouring locality of Moore, which together had a population of 315 people.

In the 2016 census, Colinton had a population of 75 people.

In the 2021 census, Colinton had a population of 60 people.

== Heritage listings ==
Colinton has the following heritage-listed sites:

- corner of the D'Aguilar Highway and Emu Creek Road (26.9304°S 152.3230°E): Colinton War Memorial

== Economy ==
There are a number of homesteads in the locality:

- Colinton Goat Farm (26.9691°S 152.2589°E)
- Colinton Station (26.9241°S 152.3247°E)
- Glenhowden (26.9987°S 152.2599°E)
- Glenlands (26.9695°S 152.2421°E)
- Greenfields (26.9379°S 152.3124°E)
- Kanangra (26.9532°S 152.2922°E)
- Kilkenny (26.9923°S 152.2686°E)
- Kokopelli (26.9426°S 152.2642°E)
- Sarner Alp (26.9386°S 152.3013°E)
- Silver Dale (26.9712°S 152.2860°E)
- Ups N Downs (26.9579°S 152.3071°E)
- Valley View (26.9590°S 152.3087°E)

== Education ==
There are no schools in Colinton. The nearest government primary schools are Harlin State School in neighbouring Harlin to the east and Linville State School in Linville to the north. The nearest government secondary schools are Yarraman State School (to Year 9 only) in Yarraman to the north-west. For secondary education to Year 12, the nearest government schools are Toogoolawah State High School in Toogoolawah to the south and Nanango State High School in Nanango to the north-west.
