= Taromeo Station =

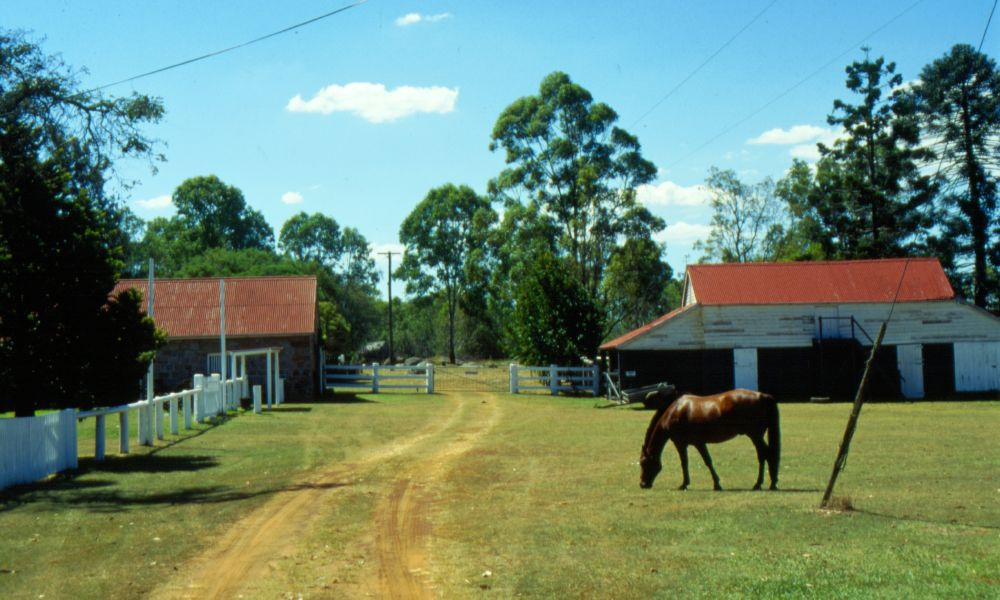
- Taromeo Stone House and Stables, 2002

- Location within Queensland Location within Australia
- 26.8174°S 152.1524°E
- Location: off the D'Aguilar Highway, Benarkin, South Burnett Region, Queensland, Australia

History
- Design period: 1840s–1860s (mid-19th century)
- Built: 1854–1860s

Queensland Heritage Register
- Official name: Taromeo Homestead complex and cemetery
- Type: state heritage (built)
- Designated: 21 October 1992
- Reference no.: 601123
- Significant period: 1840s–1870s (historical); 1850s–1860s (fabric) ongoing (social)
- Significant components: headstone, graveyard, store/s / storeroom / storehouse, wall/s, shop – blacksmith's, butcher's shop / killing shed / slaughter house (pastoral), yards – livestock, stables, out building/s, grave marker

Taromeo Station is a pastoral farm off the D'Aguilar Highway, Benarkin, South Burnett Region, Queensland, Australia. It was built from 1842 to the 1860s. The historical Taromeo Homestead complex encompassing the stone house, butchers shop, red-cedar horse stables, and cemetery were added to the Queensland Heritage Register on 21 October 1992.

== History ==
Taromeo Station was one of the original pastoral properties in the area and was taken up soon after land in Queensland became available for free settlement in 1842. The district was first divided into three huge runs, Taromeo, Tarong and Nanango, although Taromeo is thought to be the earliest of these by some months.

By 1841 would-be squatters were moving into southeast Queensland, settling first on the Darling Downs. The first sale of Brisbane land took place in Sydney in July 1842 and soon after an expedition comprising Andrew Petrie, Walter Wrottesley, W. Joliffe, Henry Stewart Russell, convicts and Aborigines set off to explore the Wide Bay area. Land holdings were quickly taken up, possibly as a result of their reports. In 1846 Captain Samuel Augustus Perry and James Charles Burnett conducted surveys and Burnett alone made a second trip in 1847 looking at river systems mainly to establish a port to serve the area.

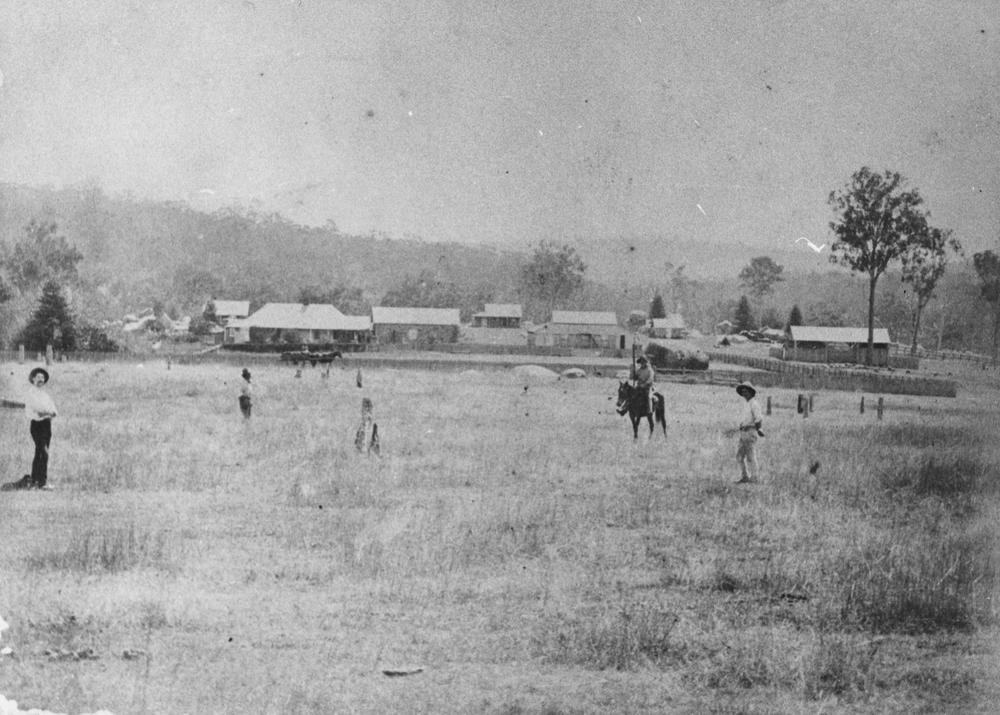
Historic Taromeo Homestead

Although there is no evidence for the date on which Taromeo was first settled, it is known that in late 1842, John Borthwick, from Buaraba Homestead near Ipswich, and William Elliott Oliver visited Taromeo Station on their way north seeking land for establishing pastoral runs. Soon afterwards, Oliver took up Nanango and Borthwick continued northward to the land that was to become Tarong Station. Simon Scott had arrived from Scotland with his brother Walter in 1839. Simon worked initially on a property at Castlereagh and arrived in the Moreton Bay region in 1841 as part of a group delivering sheep to Cressbrook station. After taking up Taromeo he returned to Castlereagh and married Christine Swanson. In March 1847 Scott returned to Taromeo with his family and on 5 July 1847 applied for a squatter's license for an area of 200 square miles.

He built a cedar house around 1850, probably replacing more primitive accommodation, and added ancillary buildings. Mrs Scott died on Christmas Day, 1851 and is buried at Taromeo, though the area was not officially proclaimed a cemetery reserve until 1878. The smithy is thought to have been built in 1854 and Robert Williams, who also built the stone house at Moore, constructed a stone store and butcher's shop for Scott in 1856. These were originally shingled and were separate buildings.

In 1857 when a survey of the area was carried out, the station was flourishing with a number of buildings constructed and a large area under cultivation. Simon Scott, who had remarried in 1854, was killed close to the house in 1858 when he fell from his horse. His brother then ran the property until his son, also named Walter, came of age. The Scott family appears to have been on relatively good terms with local indigenous people and Walter Scott Junior, later Member of the Queensland Legislative Assembly for Burnett and Mulgrave between 1871 and 1878, is reputed to have spoken their language fluently.

In the 1870s, Cobb and Co established a route between Brisbane and Nanango and Taromeo became an overnight stop where horses were rested and passengers accommodated. The station ceased running sheep to raise cattle.

The original lease holding of Taromeo was reduced as the government sought to encourage closer settlement in the South Burnett region. Beginning in the 1870s, resumptions occurred over many years, through consolidation in the 1880s, to the early twentieth century when two Land Acts (1897 and 1902) allowed the resumption of much of the lease. In 1889 Walter Scott voluntarily allowed resumption of a large area on which the townships of Blackbutt and Benarkin were established, though most of it was subdivided into 160-acre farms. The Queensland National Bank took over the property in the 1890s, leaving Mrs Scott as the manager after her husband died. She retired to live in Brisbane in 1897, when a relative then managed the property until the outbreak of World War I.

The original homestead building was demolished in the 1930s, but work has been carried out to repair the early buildings back to their former glory. Taromeo Station has been in the hands of the current owners for over forty years. A manager is also located on site and is the first point of contact for those who wish to view the buildings and early station records. Please note that Taromeo is a working cattle property and strictly private property, it is integral that an appointment is made with the manager via telephone prior to arrival. The cemetery is accessible and is administered by the local government authority and property owners.

The cemetery was destroyed In the 2010-2011 Queensland floods. A $180,000 restoration project was funded by the Queensland and Australian Governments and the work was carried out by Ziegler Monumentals of Toowoomba and was completed by February 2013.

== Description ==
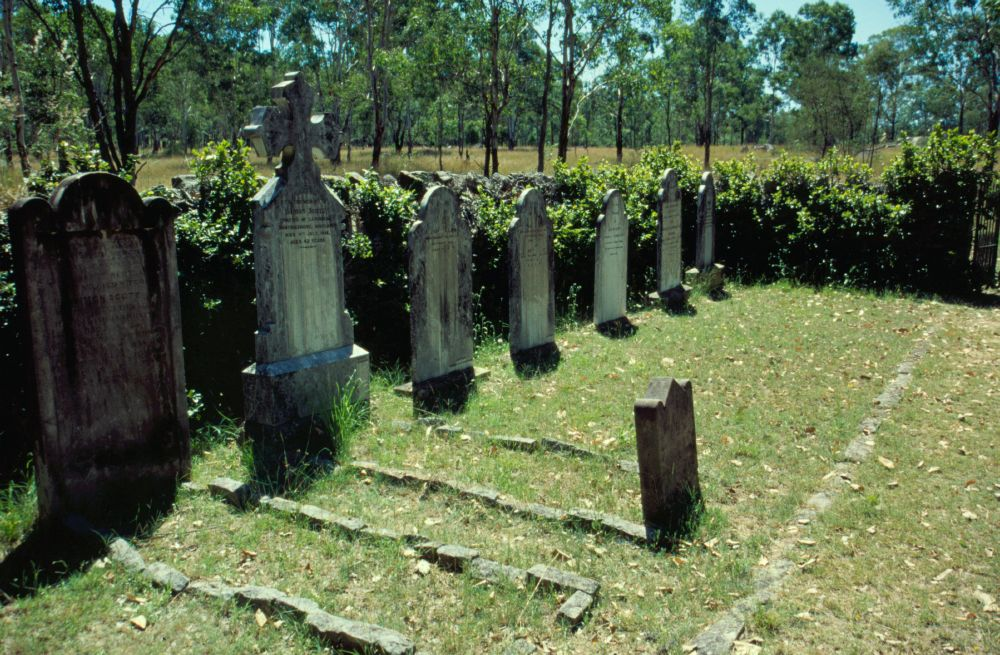
Graves at Taromeo Homestead, 2002

The homestead buildings are situated in open rolling country that features large granite outcrops and boulders. Rocky outcrops and large trees are interspersed between the buildings.

On the western side of the entrance drive are two residential timber buildings, possibly from the 1930s, and a butchers shop. This has a pyramidal roof of corrugated iron with a core constructed of vertical boards, open below the roof. A flat modern roof has been erected on the western side. These buildings are separated from the earlier buildings of the complex by a fence. To the northwest is a kitchen garden fenced with timber slabs, which has a small timber structure in one corner.

The stone stables and store face each other across the entrance drive and are the dominant buildings in the group. The store is a rectangular building with an east–west axis. It is made of granite blocks and has a gabled roof clad in corrugated iron. Windows barred by timber strips flank the central door on the southern side. The walls are thick and rendered internally and are lined with narrow shelves. It has a floor of wide boards and a loft area accessed by a ladder. There is a door high in the gable end that was probably used for loading from a cart into the loft area. A door on the northern side of the building has been filled in and there is a slab lean-to section abutting this side of the building. Adjoining the store is a stone butchers shop. It has a lower roof with a small raised section along the centre of the roof ridge for ventilation.

The stables have slab walls to plate height and comprise a rectangular core with a gabled roof and a verandah roof to the west, north and east. There is also a lean to extension to the east. The stables have a weatherboard hayloft added across the original gabled section. Openings along the southern side have large doors with forged pins, catches and hinges. To the north of the stables are yards.

Behind the store and butchers and separated from them by a large rocky outcrop is a single storey timber residence. Across from this to the north is a slab building with a gabled corrugated iron roof, which was the former blacksmith's shop. No blacksmithing equipment remains inside. In a line beyond this are a modern corrugated iron and weatherboard storage shed and a small bathroom structure comprising an enclosed, gabled roofed section with a drum shower suspended over a slatted timber floor. A corrugated iron partition divides this from an entrance area with a timber bench and washbowl. To the side of this is an open section sheltered by a skillion roof.

About 50 metres (160 ft) to the east of these buildings is a milking shed with a pole frame, open sides and a gabled roof clad in corrugated iron. The interior is fitted with cow bails. The adjoining yards are enclosed with sawn timber rails wired to posts.

To the west of the homestead and across the creek is the family cemetery. A crenellated stone wall of coursed rubble encloses it and it is entered by an iron gate. Within the wall, arranged in two rows, are the graves of members of the Scott family. The memorials date from 1851 to 1962 and include including that of Simon Scott who died in 1858. A number of those buried were born on Taromeo in the 1840s and 50s. Some graves are outlined with granite stones, as is the narrow path down the center. There are unmarked graves of Taromeo staff behind the cemetery enclosure including that of the mason responsible for the stonework.

== Heritage listing ==
Taromeo Homestead complex and cemetery was listed on the Queensland Heritage Register on 21 October 1992 having satisfied the following criteria.

The place is important in demonstrating the evolution or pattern of Queensland's history.

Taromeo Station was established by Simon Scott in about 1842 and is thought to have been the first run taken up in the Wide Bay/Burnett area. The run demonstrates the development of Queensland, particularly this area from the establishment of pastoral holdings in 1840s to closer settlement from the 1870s. The property illustrates the development of pastoral practices in Queensland, particularly the development of the beef industry in the South Burnett Region.

The place demonstrates rare, uncommon or endangered aspects of Queensland's cultural heritage.

Taromeo has a number of rare built elements including a stone walled private cemetery, thought to be one of only two stone walled family cemeteries in Australia

The place has potential to yield information that will contribute to an understanding of Queensland's history.

The early date of Taromeo with its many extant features suggest that a potential exists for further historical and archaeological research which may yield information which will contribute to an understanding of early Queensland station life.

The place is important in demonstrating the principal characteristics of a particular class of cultural places.

The station complex at Taromeo is important in demonstrating the principal characteristics of an early Queensland pastoral station. The arrangement of the early buildings and their relationship to each other provides important evidence of early station life.

The place is important because of its aesthetic significance.

Taromeo has aesthetic significance; the site has a picturesque quality resulting from the layering of traditional buildings of various styles, materials and periods of construction set amongst granite outcrops and large trees.

The place has a strong or special association with a particular community or cultural group for social, cultural or spiritual reasons.

Taromeo has special associations with the South Burnett community as one of their first settled stations and as a place of employment for local residents and their families many of whom remain in the area. The place is associated particularly with the Scott family who are important pioneers in the area.
