= Stonehouse, Moore =

Australian heritage-listed property, circa 1874

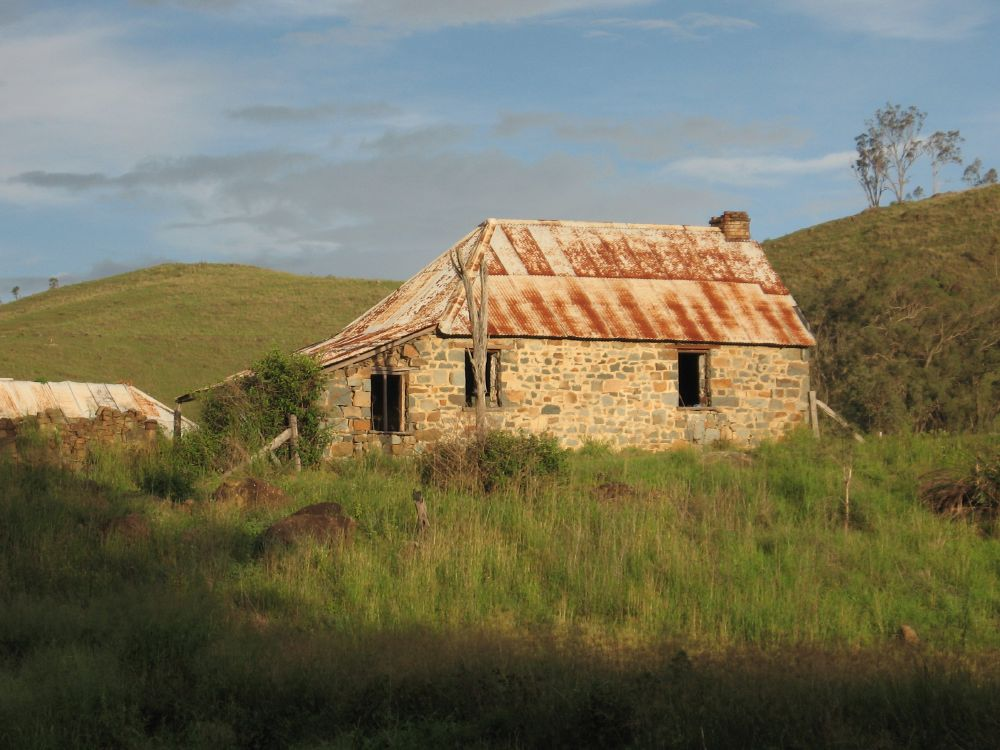
- Stonehouse, 1979

- Location within Queensland Location within Australia
- 26.9011°S 152.254°E
- Location: D'Aguilar Highway, Moore, Somerset Region, Queensland, Australia

History
- Design period: 1870s - 1890s (late 19th century)
- Built: c. 1874 - 1888

Queensland Heritage Register
- Official name: Stonehouse, Moore Stone Houses
- Type: state heritage (built, archaeological)
- Designated: 25 October 2002
- Reference no.: 601626
- Significant period: 1870s-1880s (fabric); 1870s-1910 (historical)
- Significant components: store/s / storeroom / storehouse, kitchen/kitchen house, hotel / inn

Stonehouse is a heritage-listed former homestead and inn on the D'Aguilar Highway, Moore, Somerset Region, Queensland, Australia. It was built from c. 1874 to 1888. It was added to the Queensland Heritage Register on 25 October 2002.

== History ==
Stonehouse is a group of related stone buildings on the D'Aguilar Highway, formerly part of the old coach road between Esk and Nanango, which were built in the 1870s and 1880s as part of a homestead and wayside inn complex.

The land on which the complex was built had been part of a pastoral run called "Colinton", which was taken up by John and Robert Balfour in 1841. The early 1840s were a period of pastoral expansion in the Moreton Bay, Darling Downs and Brisbane Valley Regions following the winding down and closure of the Moreton Bay penal colony (now Brisbane). Although the Darling Downs had been visited in 1827 by explorer Allan Cunningham, who had reported favourably on the suitability of the district for pastoralism, the presence of the fifty-mile exclusion zone around the penal colony and consequent lack of port access had discouraged early settlement. In 1840, the Leslie brothers arrived from the Clarence River district and took up Canning Downs, the first pastoral run on the Darling Downs. In 1841 the runs in the Brisbane Valley were Cressbrook, Colinton and Farney Lawn taken up under licences to occupy Crown Land beyond the limit of settlement. By 1842, when Moreton Bay was thrown open for free settlement, a cluster of huge runs had claimed most of the productive land on the Darling Downs and searches for grazing country were extending north. The area around Stonehouse was declared as pastoral district in May 1842 and the runs of Kilcoy, Taromeo, Taabinga and Burrandowan were taken up in that year.

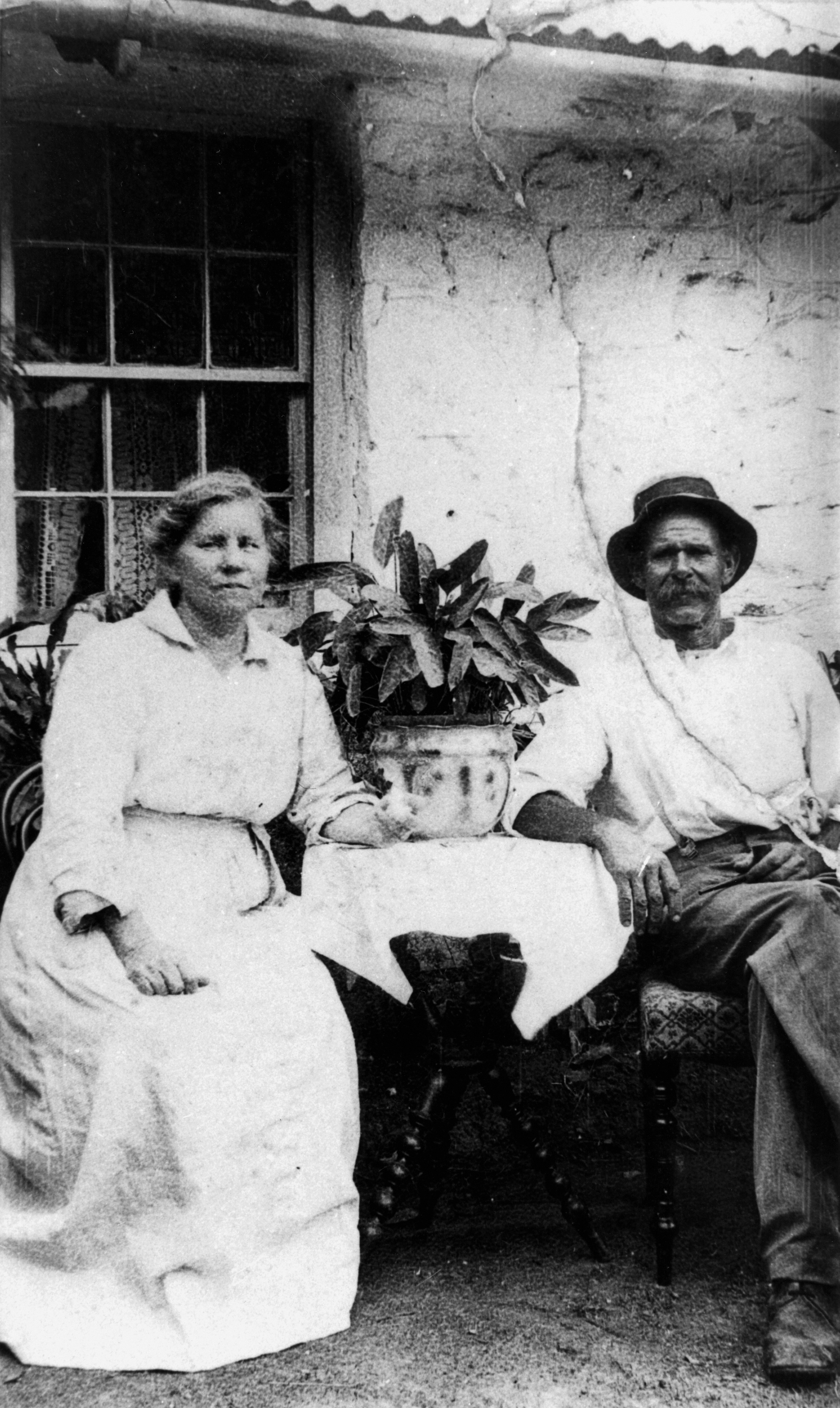
Jane Williams at Stonehouse, Moore

The separation of Queensland occurred in 1859 and in the 1868 the Crown Lands Alienation Act was passed to make land available for closer settlement by drastically reducing the size of existing pastoral runs. This brought more settlers into the Brisbane Valley. In 1873 and 1874 around 30 members of the Williams family of Gloucestershire in England arrived in Queensland as immigrants. They settled in Brisbane, Ipswich and the Brisbane Valley. Robert Williams, a widower, had previously lived in Ipswich in the 1860s and in 1874 he selected two blocks of land totalling 2442 acres from the Colinton lease as a grazing property. His brother Charles with his wife Emma joined him. Charles, who was a stonemason, began work on a five-roomed stone house at the selection, which Robert had named Stonehouse after the village in Gloucestershire where he had lived. The new building was close to a two-room slab house that the family presumably lived in during construction. Building in stone was an unusual choice in this area, but a natural one for a family of stonemasons, given the ready availability of the materia on site. Because the house was built of stone, the name later became corrupted to "Stone House" or "Stone Houses".

In the 1870s, Edward (Ned) MacDonald started a coach and mail service between his hotel at Esk and Goode's Inn at Nanango along the old dray route. Several stops for changes of horses punctuated the trip. Stonehouse was one of these and the Williams built stables on the river flats across the road from the inn. Robert Williams applied for and gained a hotel licence for the property in 1880 as the Stonehouse Hotel, Wallaby Creek, Colinton.

The places where major routes crossed watercourses were often used as camps by drovers and carriers and were excellent locations for inns that catered to travellers. These were places where one could obtain food and accommodation for people and horses, where it was usually possible to obtain the services of a blacksmith, leave or collect mail and gain information on the condition of the road ahead. The inns were also a social amenity as a source of company and conviviality on the road. Their services made the development of regular supply routes possible, which in turn made a major contribution to the way in which areas were opened up for European settlement.

In 1884 the Stonehouse license was forfeited following an incident where Robert Williams was threatened with an axe following his attempt to intervene in a drink-fuelled argument between members of group of Aborigines camped near the hotel. However, he continued to provide food and accommodation for travellers, and is mentioned in the popular 19th-century ballad Brisbane Ladies as being a stop on the road.

In 1882, Emma Williams died and was buried near the creek. This grave was washed away by a flood surge in the 1940s. Robert Williams remarried and a kitchen and pantry were constructed as apprentice work by his nephew Frank Williams. Charles Williams died in 1887 as the result of an accident near "Taromeo" where he had been carrying out stonework. The last masonry work carried out at Stonehouse was in 1888 when Frank Williams completed the store and butcher's shop.

In 1893, Alex MacCallum, who thereafter ran a coach service that used the facilities at Stonehouse, gained the mail contract. It ran until 1910, at first three times a week, then from 1902, twice a week. Times were changing and in 1900 a Royal Commission was appointed to investigate the possible route for a railway in the area, taking evidence at Esk, "Cressbrook", "Colinton" and Stonehouse, which were the coach stops. "Colinton" was cut up and sold around this time, bringing in many new settlers and Stonehouse acted as a provision store and butcher's shop for them.

A small township was surveyed at Moore, named for the then owners of "Colinton", gaining a postal receiving office in 1903 and a post office in 1905. In 1910 a railway station opened at Moore.

Robert Williams had died in 1907 and was buried near Moore. A memorial made by Frank Williams, who had established a monumental masonry firm at Ipswich in 1901, marks his grave. Frank was later to construct many war memorials, including the Esk, the Gatton War Memorial, the Warwick War Memorial and the Ipswich War Memorial. Stonehouse was left in trust to a nephew, Thomas (TJC) Williams, who moved to the property with his family in 1908. A sale was then held of cattle, pigs and the post horses. At the time it was found that the buildings needed maintenance and by 1910 repairs and refurbishment had been carried out. By this time iron had already been laid over the original shingles. Between 1914 and 1918 the first house was demolished and the stables collapsed. A tennis court was erected in the vicinity of the stables.

In 1923 Jane Williams became ill and the family moved to Brisbane, leasing Stonehouse to Allan Patterson who arranged for Arthur Ollenburg, a Williams family member, to manage the property. TJC Williams died in 1932 and Jane in 1933. The Stonehouse land was subdivided and sold by auction. J J Tilley purchased the land containing Stonehouse and in 1939 it was bought by Barney Grant who continued to employ Arthur Ollenburg as manager. Grant died in 1945 and in 1946 his son took over the management of Stonehouse and built a house for himself and his family.

In 1950 a plaque recognising the historical significance of Stonehouse to the area was affixed to the house, but between 1948 and 1960 the buggy shed, workshop, hayshed, poultry run, slaughterhouse and barn were demolished. In 1967 a storm removed the front verandah roof of the main building. A large crack in the wall had developed and a section of the house was then demolished. The Esk Shire Council used stone blocks from this section to construct a picnic shelter at Moore.

The house was inspected and drawn by Karl Langer for the National Trust of Queensland in 1969. Since then the buildings have continued to deteriorate and the proportion of the main building still standing has diminished. In January 2001 the property changed hands with the new owners committed to preserving Stonehouse.

== Description ==
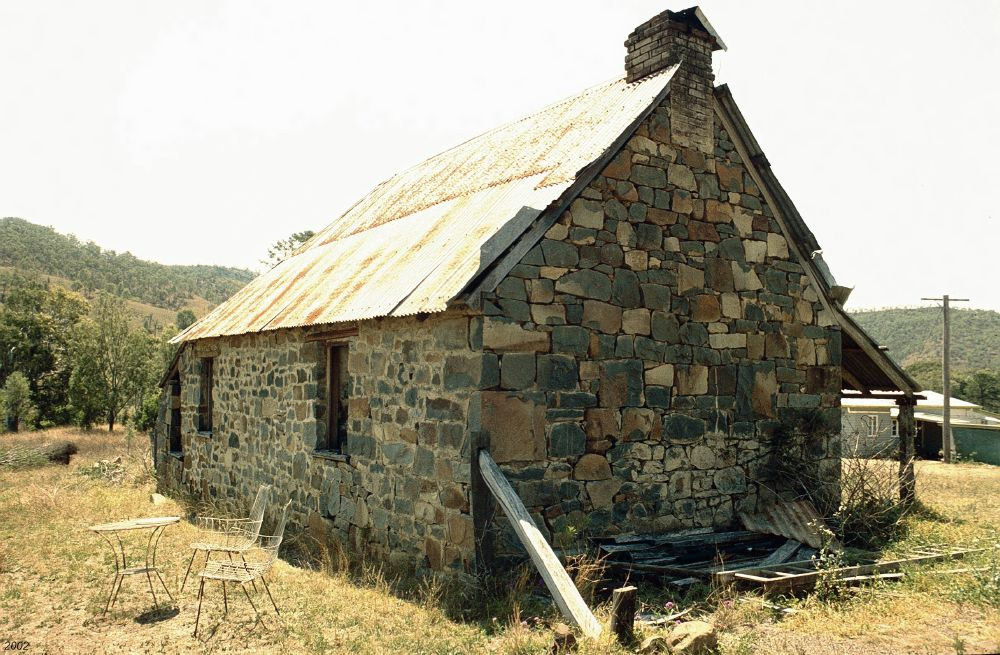
Stonehouse, 2002

Stonehouse currently comprises three stone structures on the southern side of the highway between Moore and Nanango. They are on a spur that drops away sharply to the west to a creek and river flat. The ridge rising behind the buildings is thought to have been the source for the stone used in construction.

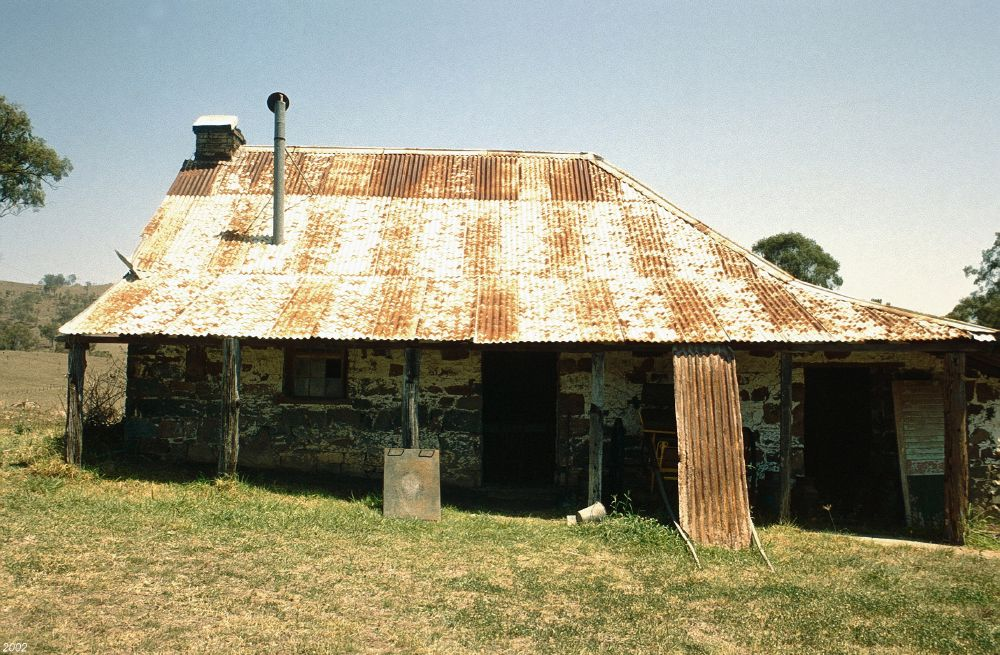
Stonehouse, 2002

Closest to the highway, which was the former coach road, are the remains of the main building. These ruins comprise one single storey wing of rubble laid with a lime mortar. The timber window and doorframes remain, though the windows and door they held have gone. Sections of a pole roof frame also survive. The rest of this building has collapsed and though sections of wall can be discerned, much of the stone has been removed over time.

Directly behind to one side of this building is a detached kitchen and pantry. This building is intact. It is rectangular in plan and is also constructed of rubble. It has a verandah roof supported on timber posts along one side over an earth floor. The gabled roof is clad with corrugated iron over a frame of poles and pit-sawn beams although the battens have been renewed. The walls are higher inside than outside and are formed around the roof beams and door lintels. The end wall to the rear contains a chimney that has been repaired with brick at the top. The interior of the structure has been limewashed and has a timber floor. There is a wide fireplace and working bench for cooking at one end with a brick floor around the hearth. At the other end of the building is a room with a lean to roof and a brick floor, which is thought to have been used as a pantry.

The store and butcher's shop is of similar construction and is set further back on the site and about 25 metres (82 ft) away from the kitchen, which was once separated from it by an internal laneway. The store has a gabled roof clad in corrugated iron with battens for shingles underneath. It comprises three rooms: a large room with a timber floor and two small rooms at the end of the building. These are connected with each other, but not with the timber floored section. The room at the rear has stone paving visible under a concrete topping. The wall at this end of the building has been clad in corrugated iron and a section at the front in recycled timber slabs.

One metre behind the store is a large modern metal shed in the position once occupied by the smithy and fowl yards. There is no visible trace of the outbuildings once located at the rear of the property.

A mid twentieth century timber building on low stumps is located at the front of the property and is the current residence.

== Heritage listing ==
Stonehouse was listed on the Queensland Heritage Register on 25 October 2002 having satisfied the following criteria.

The place is important in demonstrating the evolution or pattern of Queensland's history.

Stonehouse is a group of stone buildings surviving from an early wayside inn and as such illustrates the pattern of European settlement in Queensland. Inns serviced early supply routes by providing food and accommodation, fresh horses and a mail exchange and greatly facilitated the spread of European settlement. In particular the Stonehouse complex illustrates the transition of the surrounding area from pastoral settlement in the early 1840s to closer settlement from the 1870s when the first structures at Stonehouse were built.

The place demonstrates rare, uncommon or endangered aspects of Queensland's cultural heritage.

The inn complex is rare in Queensland both as a surviving example of a travellers' inn and as a group of early stone buildings that utilise material found on site.

The place has potential to yield information that will contribute to an understanding of Queensland's history.

The Stonehouse inn, its subsidiary structures and the area around them, which formed part of the inn yards, have the potential to reveal information about the operation of wayside inns in Queensland.

The place is important in demonstrating the principal characteristics of a particular class of cultural places.

Stonehouse is a good example of its kind and preserves examples of early building techniques in both stone and timber.

The place is important because of its aesthetic significance.

The Stonehouse complex has strong aesthetic appeal as a group of well-made traditional buildings that are pleasing in form, materials and detail. The use of local stone makes them visually harmonious with the landscape and their prominent position above the highway has made them a well-liked landmark.

The place has a special association with the life or work of a particular person, group or organisation of importance in Queensland's history.

'Stonehouse' has associations with several generations of the Williams family, who emigrated from Gloucestershire to Queensland as an extended family group in the early 1870s. It has particular associations with Charles and Frank William who constructed the building, Frank Williams later becoming a notable monumental mason.
