= Moore, Queensland =

Moore
- Town
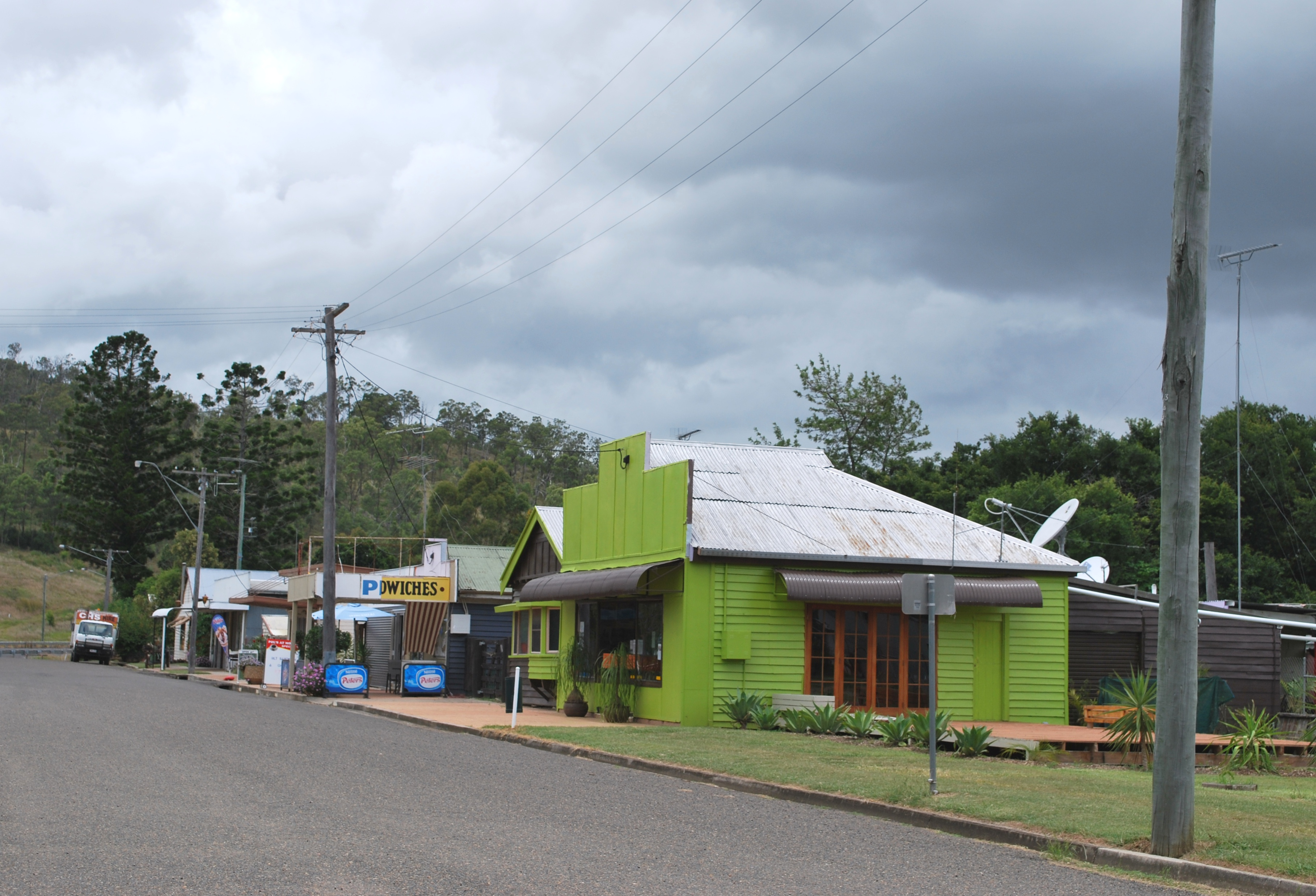
- Shops in Moore

- Interactive map of Moore
- Coordinates: 26.8913°S 152.2911°E
- Country: Australia
- State: Queensland
- LGA: Somerset Region
- Location: 25.6 km (15.9 mi) NNW of Toogoolawah; 31.8 km (19.8 mi) WNW of Kilcoy; 42.9 km (26.7 mi) N of Esk; 58.2 km (36.2 mi) SE of Nanango; 139 km (86 mi) NW of Brisbane

Government
  - State electorate: Nanango
  - Federal division: Blair

Area
  - Total: 177.1 km^{2} (68.4 sq mi)

Population
  - Total: 286 (2021 census)
  - Density: 1.615/km^{2} (4.183/sq mi)
- Time zone: UTC+10:00 (AEST)
- Postcode: 4314
- County: Cavendish
- Parish: Colinton
Localities around Moore
Taromeo; Benarkin North	Linville	Sheep Station Creek
Benarkin	Moore	Harlin
Cherry Creek	Colinton	Colinton

Moore is a rural town and locality in the Somerset Region, Queensland, Australia. In the 2021 census, the locality of Moore had a population of 286 people.

== Geography ==
Moore is situated at the base of the Balfour Range between Esk in the Brisbane River valley and Yarraman in the South Burnett. The Brisbane River passes through the locality from north to south passing to the east of the town centre. The D'Aguilar Highway runs from the south to the north-west of the locality. The western end of the locality is within the Benarkin State Forest.

Moore contains the following mountains and mountain passes (from north to south):

- Marion Hill (26.8496°S 152.3352°E) 350 metres (1,150 ft)
- Mount Miner (26.8531°S 152.3849°E) 408 metres (1,339 ft)
- Gwendolen Hill (26.8591°S 152.3638°E) 377 metres (1,237 ft)
- Dunwich Gap (26.8637°S 152.3208°E)
- Dryden Gap (26.8640°S 152.3353°E)
- Wilsons Gap (26.8663°S 152.2887°E)
- Grasstree Gap (26.8686°S 152.3587°E)
- Mount Lionel (26.8741°S 152.3537°E) 372 metres (1,220 ft)
- Boomerang Gap (26.8759°S 152.3636°E)
- Christy Gap (26.8767°S 152.3717°E)
- The Round Mountain (26.8930°S 152.3002°E) 247 metres (810 ft)

== History ==
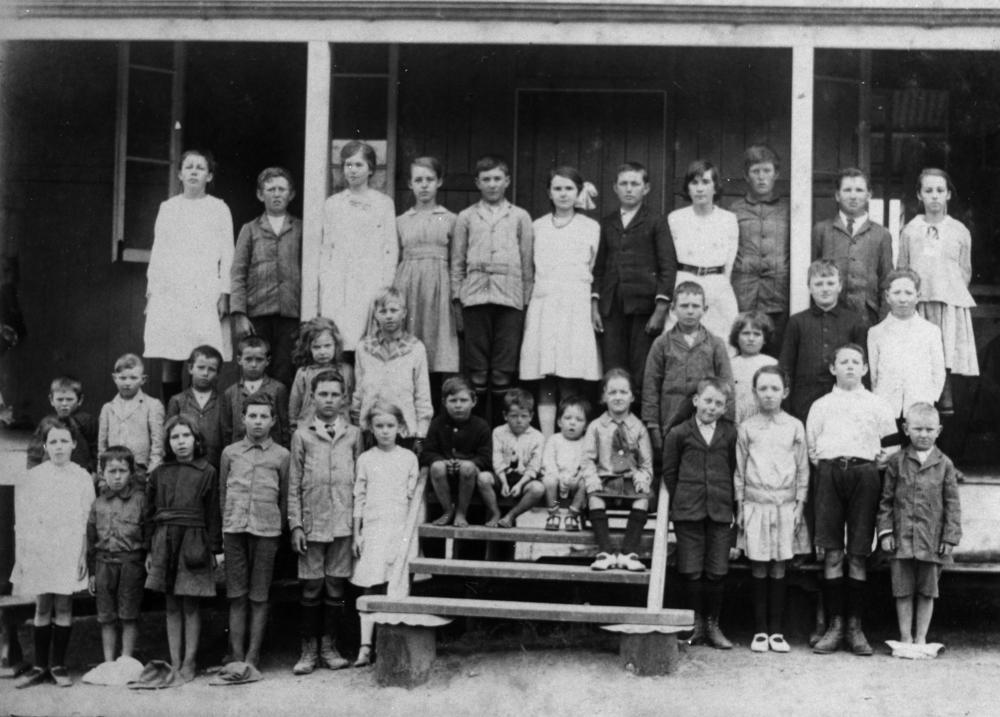
Students of Moore State School, ca. 1915

Duungidjawu (also known as Kabi Kabi, Cabbee, Carbi, Gabi Gabi) is an Australian Aboriginal language spoken on Duungidjawu country. The Duungidjawu language region includes the landscape within the local government boundaries of Somerset Region and City of Moreton Bay, particularly the towns of Caboolture, Kilcoy, Woodford and Moore.

The town was originally known as Stanley Gate and then as Mooretown. In July 1910 the town took the name of Moore from its railway station, which was named after John and William Moore, graziers of Colinton.

Moore Provisional School opened on 1 December 1904, becoming Moore State School in 1908. The school was mothballed on 31 December 2006 and was officially closed on 23 October 2007. The school was sold for $77,000 in 2012. The school occupied two sites across the road from one another at 29-31 Linville Road and 1 School Street (26.8915°S 152.2921°E).

Moore Post Office opened by September 1905 (a receiving office had been open from 1903).

On 22 November 1910, the Brisbane Valley railway line opened from Yimbun to Moore. The town was served by Moore railway station (26.8900°S 152.2945°E). The line closed in 1993.

On 1 February 2018, Moore's postcode changed from 4306 to 4314.

== Demographics ==
In the 2011 census, Moore and the surrounding area had a population of 315 people.

In the 2016 census, the locality of Moore had a population of 296 people.

In the 2021 census, the locality of Moore had a population of 286 people.

== Heritage listings ==
Moore has a number of heritage-listed sites, including:

- Stonehouse: D'Aguilar Highway (26.9011°S 152.254°E):

== Education ==
There are no schools in Moore, although there used to be a school that closed many years ago. The nearest government primary schools are Linville State School in neighbouring Linville to the north, Benarkin State School in neighbouring Benarkin to the west and Harlin State School in neighbouring Harlin to the south-east. The nearest government secondary schools are Toogoolawah State High School (to Year 12) in Toogoolawah to the south, Kilcoy State High School (to Year 12) in Kilcoy to the south-east, Yarraman State School (to Year 10) in Yarraman to the west, and Nanango State High School (to Year 12) in Nanango to the north-west.
