= 2008 Queensland storms =

Storms in Queensland, Australia

Coordinates: 27°26′38″S 152°57′11″E

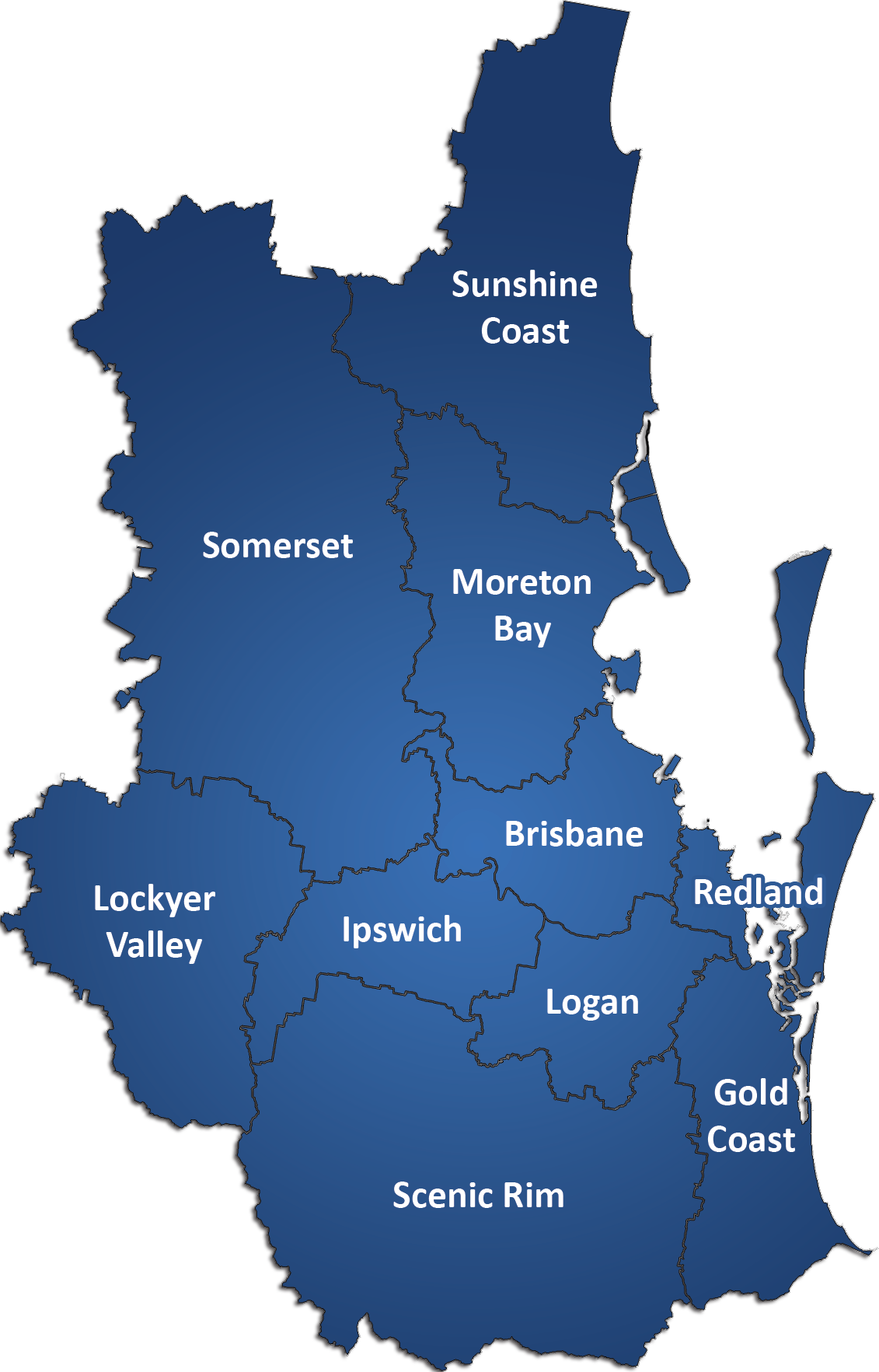
- Map of south-east Queensland

Overall effects
- Fatalities: 2
- Damage: Insured: A$95 million Total: about A$500 million^{1}: 1. as of 21 November 2008

The 2008 Queensland storms were a series of three thunderstorms that struck South East Queensland, Australia. The first storm hit on 16 November 2008 and was followed by two further storms on 19 and 20 November. The storms resulted in 2 fatalities.

== Background ==
=== First incident ===
Winds reached 130 kilometres (81 mi)/h, equivalent to a Category 3 cyclone. Electricity was cut to about 230,000 homes and about 4,000 homes were left in need of serious repair, and at least 30 houses were beyond repair. Some of the worst hit areas included The Gap, Kenmore, Arana Hills and Albany Creek. Forecasters at the Bureau of Meteorology rated the storm the worst to hit south-east Queensland since 2004 & The Biggest to The South east Queensland region since 1985.

=== Second incident ===
Torrential rain affected areas of Brisbane, Ipswich and Toowoomba, with rainfall reaching more than 250 mm in some locations. The Ipswich and Marburg areas were the worst affected, whilst four homes in inner-city Paddington were unroofed. The Inner City Bypass was flooded and forced to close, as was the Moggill Ferry.

=== Third incident ===
Blackwater, near Emerald in Central Queensland, was hit hard by the third storm, with 20 houses sustaining roof damage and up to 100 more were damaged in some way. Gregory MP Vaughan Johnson said the storm was terrifying. He said he was driving to an appointment when the storm slammed into Blackwater, forcing him to turn back to Emerald. Hail was described as the size of golf balls and witnesses saw a lot of damage.

== Relief effort ==
Australian Prime Minister Kevin Rudd inspected The Gap, a badly hit suburb in north-western Brisbane, with Premier of Queensland Anna Bligh and the Lord Mayor of Brisbane Campbell Newman on 18 November, likening it to a "war zone". He announced that Centrelink would make payments of $1000 per adult and $400 per dependent child in cases where they were seriously injured or their houses were destroyed. Bligh launched a Disaster Relief Appeal with $500,000 to supplement other government support packages.

== See also ==
- Severe storms in Australia
