= Benarkin =

- Town
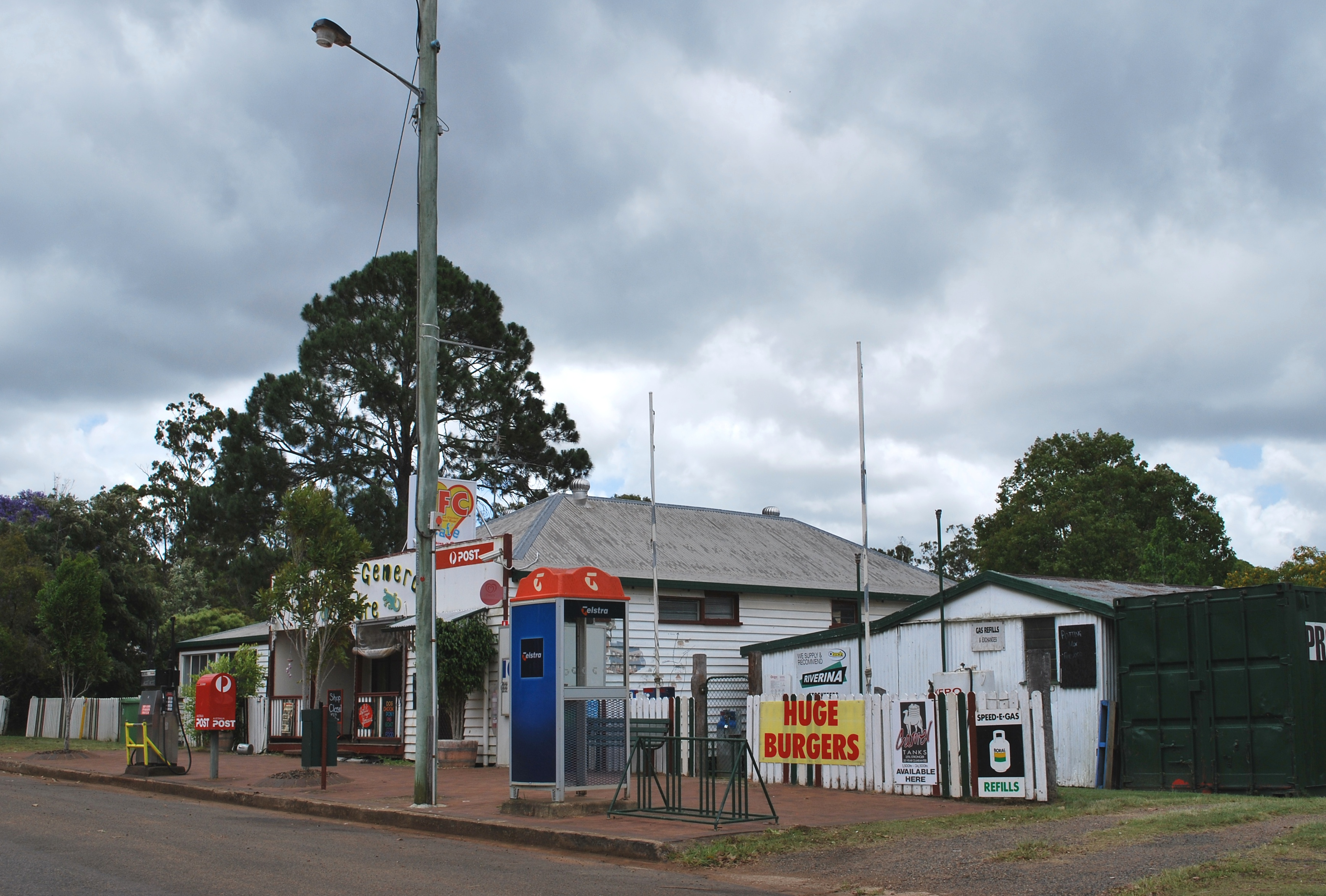
- General store

- Interactive map of Benarkin
- Coordinates: 26.8861°S 152.1372°E
- Country: Australia
- State: Queensland
- LGA: South Burnett Region
- Location: 3.9 km (2.4 mi) E of Blackbutt; 39.0 km (24.2 mi) SE of Nanango; 76.1 km (47.3 mi) SE of Kingaroy; 148 km (92 mi) NW of Brisbane

Government
  - State electorate: Nanango
  - Federal division: Maranoa

Area
  - Total: 4.2 km^{2} (1.6 sq mi)

Population
  - Total: 61 (2021 census locality)
  - Density: 14.52/km^{2} (37.6/sq mi)
- Time zone: UTC+10:00 (AEST)
- Postcode: 4306
- County: Cavendish
Localities around Benarkin
Blackbutt North	Benarkin North	Benarkin North
Blackbutt	Benarkin	Moore
Blackbutt South	Cherry Creek	Cherry Creek

Benarkin is a rural town and locality in the South Burnett Region, Queensland, Australia. The nearby town of Blackbutt is the origin of the town and the two towns are often referred to as the joint entity Blackbutt-Benarkin. In the 2021 census, the locality of Benarkin had a population of 61 people.

== Geography ==
Benarkin is located on the Balfour Range approximately 3.5 kilometres (2.2 mi) east of Blackbutt and is by-passed by the D'Aguilar Highway. The Benarkin State Forest is located to the east and south of the town.

== History ==
The locality was originally called Well Holes. The current locality name of Benarkin takes its name from ''Benarqui'' from the Dungibara language which refers to the blackbutt tree (Eucalyptus pilularis) which are common in the district. When the Blackbutt railway station was built to serve the town of Blackbutt, it was some distance from the town, so it was decided to name the railway station Bernakin in 1910 and this name was then used for the settlement that grew up around the railway station. Because of the close proximity (3.5 kilometres (2.2 mi) apart) and intertwined history of the two towns, they are often referred to as the twin towns of Blackbutt-Benarkin.

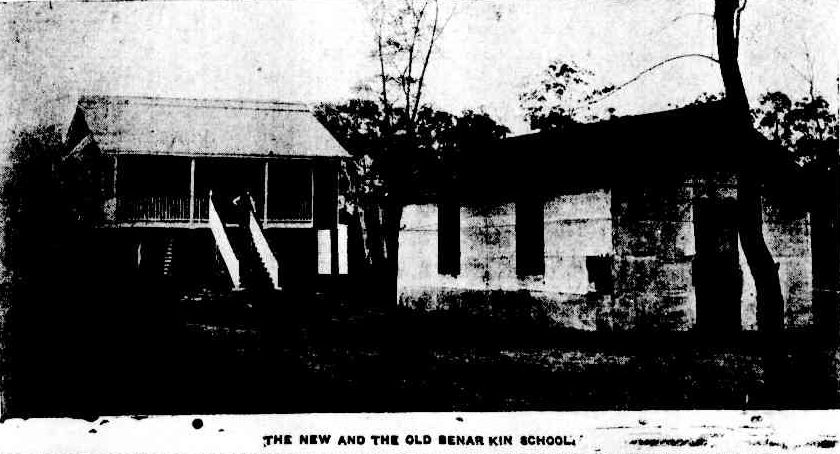
Benarkin State School, new building, old tent, 1913

Macnamara's Camp Provisional School opened on 4 July 1910 but in November 1910 it was moved to Well Holes and renamed Well Holes Provisional School. In 1911, it was renamed Benarkin Provisional School. The school was operating from a tent. In March 1913 a building was constructed and it became Benarkin State School on 1 April 1913. It closed in 1920, but reopened on 4 September 1935.

Benarkin Post Office opened by March 1911.

On 11 November 1996, a memorial was established to jointly commemorate the soldiers who took part in the Battle of Hill 60 at Gallipoli in World War I and the pioneer forestry workers of the district. The memorial is located on Hill 60 Road in the Benarkin State Forest (26.876073°S 152.161796°E).

On 1 February 2018, Benarkin's postcode changed from 4306 to 4314.

== Demographics ==
In the 2011 census, the localities of Benarkin and Blackbutt had a combined population of 1,055 people.

In the 2016 census, the locality of Benarkin had a population of 61 people.

In the 2021 census, the locality of Benarkin had a population of 61 people.

== Heritage listings ==
Benarkin has a number of heritage-listed sites, including:

- Taromeo Homestead, off D'Aguilar Highway (26.8174°S 152.1524°E)

== Education ==
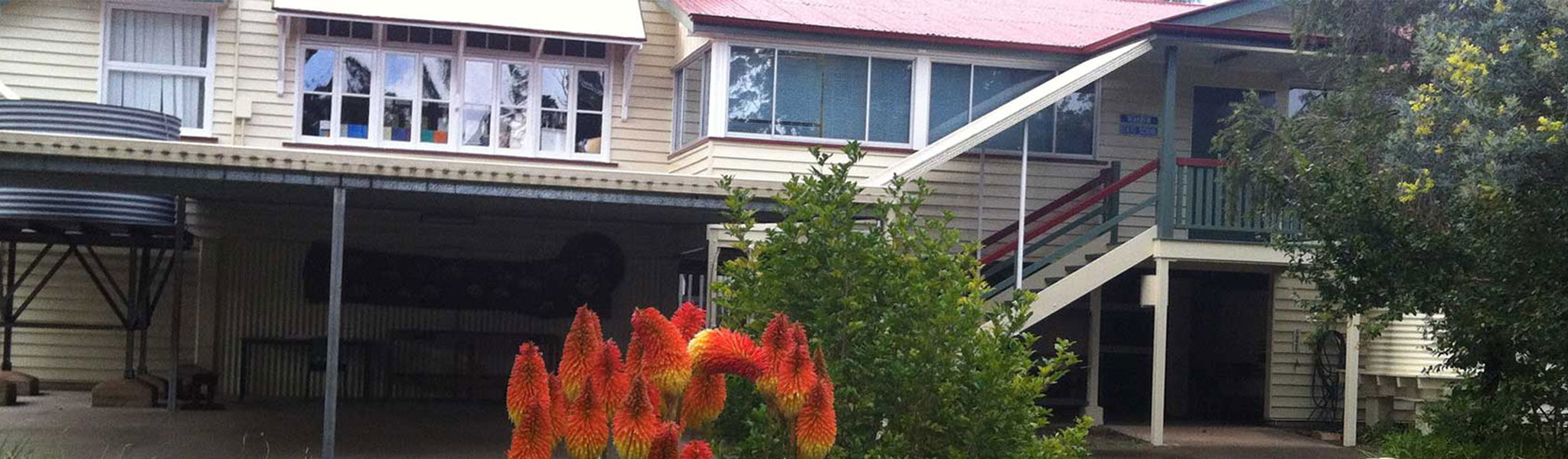
Benarkin State School, 2024

Benarkin State School is a government primary (Prep–6) school for boys and girls at Scott Street (26.8844°S 152.1417°E). In 2017, the school had an enrolment of 27 students with 6 teachers (4 full-time equivalent) and 5 non-teaching staff (3 full-time equivalent).

There are no secondary schools in Benarkin. The nearest government secondary schools are Yarraman State School (to Year 9) in Yarraman to the north-west and Nanango State High School (to Year 12) in Nanango to the north.

== Attractions ==
The Brisbane Valley Rail Trail passes through Benarkin, following the route of the former railway line. It is for walking and cycling, no motorised vehicles are permitted.
