= Blackbutt, Queensland =

Blackbutt
- Town
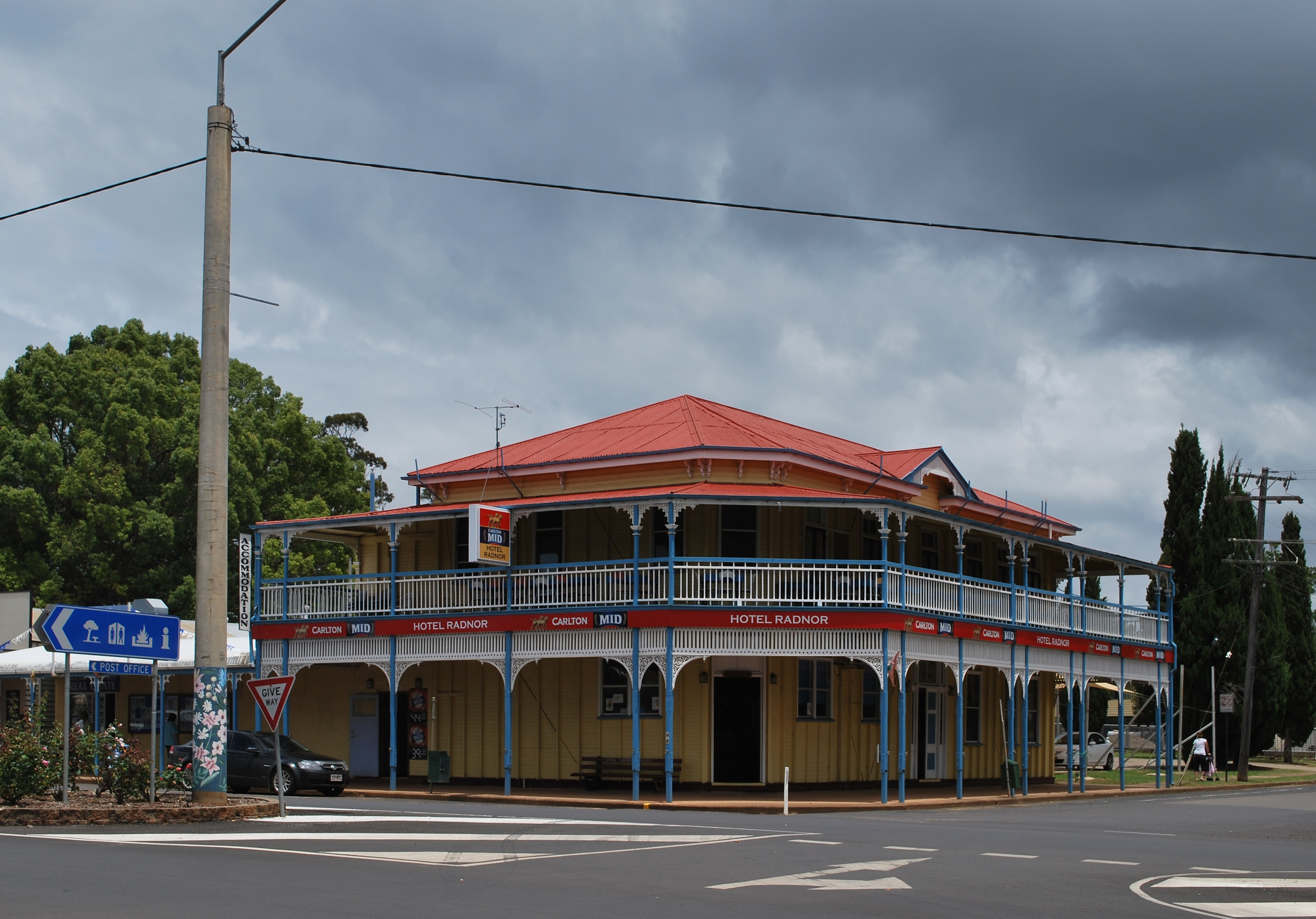
- Hotel Radnor

- Interactive map of Blackbutt
- Coordinates: 26.8855°S 152.1030°E
- Country: Australia
- State: Queensland
- LGA: South Burnett Region
- Location: 36.2 km (22.5 mi) SSE of Nanango; 60.6 km (37.7 mi) SE of Kingaroy; 102 km (63 mi) NNE of Toowoomba; 161 km (100 mi) NW of Brisbane
- Established: 1887

Government
  - State electorate: Nanango
  - Federal division: Maranoa

Area
  - Total: 7.9 km^{2} (3.1 sq mi)
- Elevation: 474 m (1,555 ft)

Population
  - Total: 799 (2021 census)
  - Density: 101.1/km^{2} (261.9/sq mi)
- Time zone: UTC+10:00 (AEST)
- Postcode: 4314
- County: Cavendish
- Parish: Taromeo
Localities around Blackbutt
Nukku	Blackbutt North	Benarkin
Nukku	Blackbutt	Benarkin
Nukku	Blackbutt South	Benarkin

Blackbutt is a rural town and locality in the South Burnett Region, Queensland, Australia. In the 2021 census, the locality of Blackbutt had a population of 799.

== Geography ==
The town is located on the D'Aguilar Highway, in the South Burnett local government area, 166 kilometres (103 mi) north-west of the state capital, Brisbane. Blackbutt lies within the Cooyar Creek catchment, tributary of the Brisbane River, which rises in the Bunya Mountains to the west.

== History ==
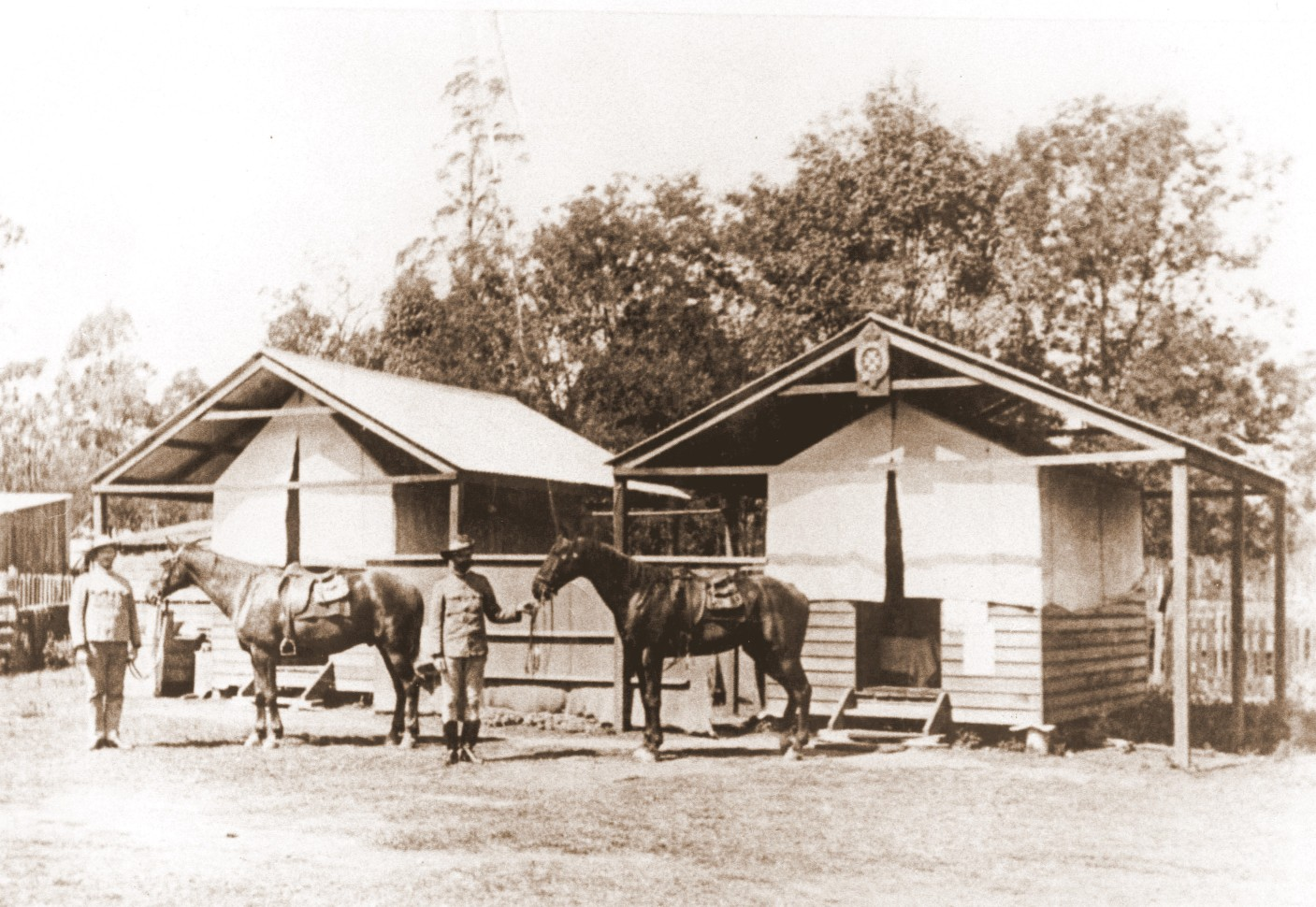
Blackbutt Police Station, 1912. Note the station badge attached to the peak of the right hand tent.

European settlement in the Blackbutt area began in 1842, when the Scott family established Taromeo Station. In 1887, the Scott family ceded land to found both Blackbutt and its neighbouring town of Benarkin. Farms were established in the area and the discovery of gold in the area in the late 19th century led to population growth in the town.

The timber industry played an important role in the development of the town.

The town is named after Eucalyptus pilularis, commonly known as blackbutt, a common tree of the family Myrtaceae native to south-eastern Australia which is one of Australia's most important hardwoods.

Blackbutt, Benarkin and the nearby town of Yarraman are often collectively referred to as the "Timber Towns" and the terms "Timbertown" and "Timbertowners" feature in the name of many local businesses and a sporting teams.

Blackbutt Provisional School opened on 20 January 1896 under teacher Rosa Bella Ryan. On 1 January 1909, it became Blackbutt State School. The school was on a 6-acre-1-rood (2.5 ha) site at 97 Blackbutt Crows Nest Road in present-day Blackbutt South (south-east corner of Haynes Kite Millar Road, 26.9011°S 152.0994°E). In 1912, school daily attendance was between 60 and 70 students, leading to a petition from parents to build a new school in a more central location. In January 1914, the school relocated its current larger site in Blackbutt.

Blackbutt Post Office opened by November 1906 (a receiving office had been open from 1896).

When the Blackbutt railway station was built to serve the town, it was some distance from the town, so in 1910 it was decided to name the station Benarkin instead. This in turn gave its name to the new town that formed near the railway station Benarkin. Because of the close proximity (3.5 kilometres (2.2 mi) apart) and intertwined history of the two towns, they are often referred to as the twin towns of Blackbutt-Benarkin. Blackbutt was connected to the Brisbane Valley railway line in 1911. However, the line was closed in the 1980s and was converted into a rail trail.

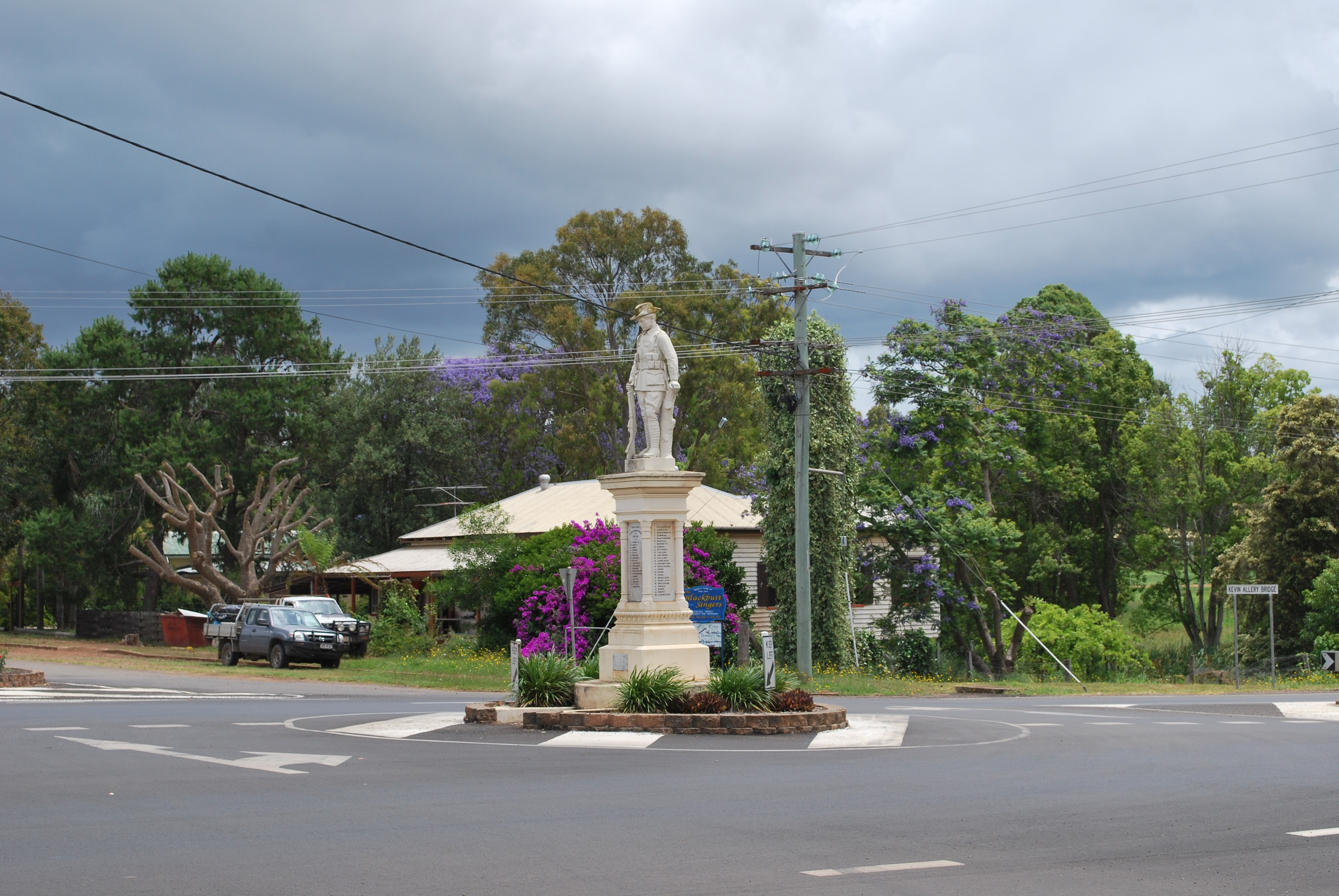
Blackbutt War Memorial, 2010

The Blackbutt War Memorial was unveiled on 24 April 1920 by J.A. Lee, the chairman of Nanango Shire.

The Blackbutt Library was opened in 1996.

Tennis great Roy Emerson was born on a farm near Blackbutt and attended Nukku State School for his early education. The former school building now houses the Roy Emerson Museum in Blackbutt.

On 1 February 2018, Blackbutt's postcode changed from 4306 to 4314.

== Demographics ==
In the 2021 census, the locality of Blackbutt had a population of 799.

In the 2016 census, the locality of Blackbutt had a population of 836.

In the 2011 census, the localities of Blackbutt and Benarkin had a combined population of 1,055.

== Transport ==
Blackbutt is the site of the Queensland Government's first trial of using fibre composite in bridge building when it was used in the replacement of Taromeo Creek bridge in 2005. Fibre composite materials are much stronger than steel and concrete but also much lighter and do not rust.

== Education ==
Blackbutt State School is a government primary (Prep–6) school for boys and girls at Crofton Street (bounded by Sutton Street, Margaret Street, and Pine Street) 26.8905°S 152.1039°E). In 2017, the school had an enrolment of 165 students with 12 teachers (11 full-time equivalent) and 18 non-teaching staff (9 full-time equivalent).

There are no secondary schools in Blackbutt. The nearest government secondary schools are Yarraman State School (to Year 9) in Yarraman to the west and Nanango State High School (to Year 12) in Nanango to the north-west.

== Amenities ==
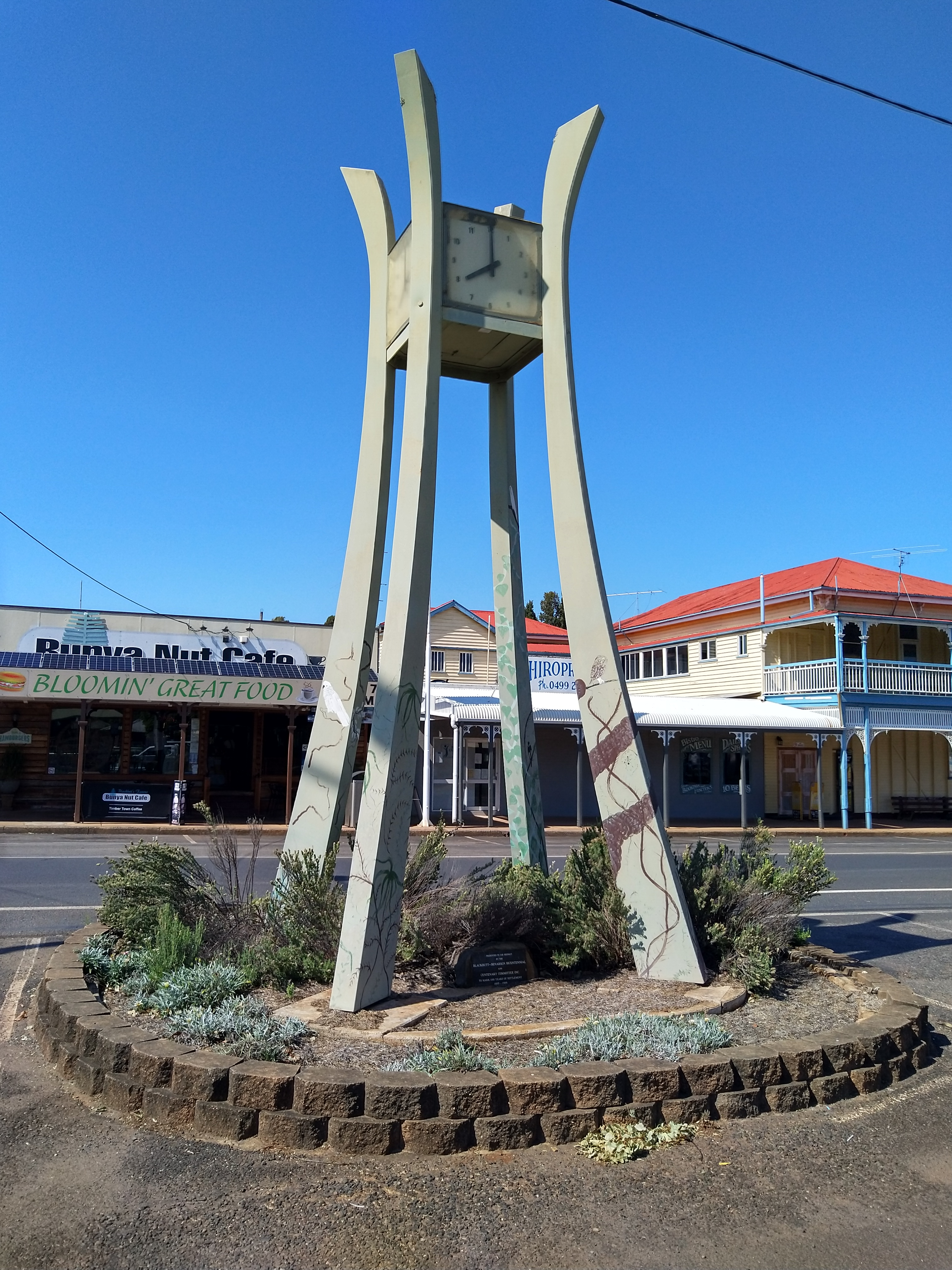
Dominating the main street is the distinctive mid-century modern (MCM) styled town clock.

The South Burnett Regional Council operates a public library in Blackbutt at 69 Hart Street (26.8843°S 152.1017°E).

The Blackbutt Yarraman branch of the Queensland Country Women's Association meets at the QCWA Hall at 65 Coulson Street (26.8856°S 152.1027°E).

== Infrastructure ==
The town water supply is primarily supplied by Boondooma Dam with Boobir Dam as a second source.

== Events ==
The Blackbutt Avocado Festival has been held annually in September since 2016, replacing the former Bloomin Beautiful Blackbutt Festival. It features avocado cooking demonstrations, avocado tossing competitions, presentations on farming avocados, in addition to other festival events, such as arts and craft displays, woodchop competitions and live music.

== Attractions ==
The Brisbane Valley Rail Trail passes through Blackbutt, following the route of the former railway line. It is for walking cycling and horse riding; no motorised vehicles are permitted.

The former Nukku school building was relocated to Hart Street (26.8835°S 152.1013°E) in Blackbutt to house the Roy Emerson Museum celebrating tennis player Roy Emerson.
