= Boarding House (disambiguation) =

A boarding house is a house, frequently a family home, in which lodgers, license and do not exclusively possess, one or more rooms, for one or more nights.

boarding house may also refer to:

== Buildings ==
- Anderson Boarding House, an historic building in Clarendon, Arkansas.
- Bass Boarding House, an historic building in Wilton, Maine.
- Bogan Boarding House, an historic building in Park City, Utah.
- Castleberry Boarding House, an historic building in Port Vincent
- Espey Boarding House (DeCicco Building), an historic building in Portland, Oregon.
- Fries Boarding Houses, two historic boarding houses in Fries, Grayson County, Virginia.
- Galo Arambarri Boarding House, an historic building near Shoshone, Idaho.
- Hester E. Suydam Boarding House, an historic building in Fromberg, Montana.
- King's Boarding House, an historic building in Maidenwell, Australia.
- Luke Bone Grocery-Boarding House, an historic building in Bald Knob, Arkansas.
- Mary E. Surratt Boarding House, an historic site of meetings of conspirators to assassinate Abraham Lincoln.
- Moye Boarding House, an historic building in Portland, Tennessee.
- Nortonia Boarding House, an historic building in Reno, Nevada.
- Smith-Williams-Durham Boarding House, an historic building in Hendersonville, North Carolina.
- W C A Boarding House, an historic building in Springfield, Massachusetts
- Yount's Woolen Mill and Boarding House, an historic building in Ripley Township, Indiana.
- Zappe Boarding House, an historic building in Ferriday, Louisiana.

== Film ==
- Boarding House Groonen (German: Pension Groonen), a 1925 Austrian silent comedy film directed by Robert Wiene.
- College Boarding House (Spanish: La casa de la Troya), a 1959 Spanish comedy film directed by Rafael Gil.
- Fultah Fisher's Boarding House, a 1922 American silent film short and the first film directed by Frank Capra.
- Boarding House Blues, a 1948 American race film directed by Josh Binney.
- Boardinghouse (film) (Boarding House, Housegeist), a 1982 American film directed, written by, and starring John Wintergate.
- The House That Screamed (1969 film) (The Boarding School), a 1969 Spanish horror film, written and directed by Narciso Ibáñez Serrador.

== Music ==
- Major Hoople's Boarding House, a Canadian pop band from Cambridge, Ontario.
- Boarding House Reach, the third studio album by American rock musician Jack White, released in 2018.
- Live at the Boarding House, an album recorded by the 1973–1974 bluegrass group, Old & In the Way.
- Live at the Boarding House: The Complete Shows, a four-CD live album by the bluegrass band Old & In the Way.
- "Silver Threads Among the Gold", a song was parodied as "In the Boarding House"
- 1978 Boarding House Tour, a tour by Neil Young

== Retail ==
- ZJ Boarding House, a surfboard, skateboard, snowboard, and clothing store in Santa Monica, California.

== Venues ==
- The Boarding House (nightclub), a music and comedy nightclub in San Francisco, California, opened by David Allen in 1971.

== Writings ==
- Our Boarding House, an American single-panel cartoon and comic strip, created by Gene Ahern, on October 3, 1921.
- The Boarding House, a short story by James Joyce, published in his 1914 collection, Dubliners.
- The Boarding House Proprietor and His Guest, a work by Clarence Gabriel Moran#Books and articles
