= Meandu Creek Dam =

Dam in Wide Bay–Burnett region of Queensland, Australia

- Location of the dam in Queensland
- Interactive map of Meandu Creek Dam
- Country: Australia
- Location: Yarraman, Wide Bay–Burnett, Queensland
- Coordinates: 26°46′28″S 151°53′46″E
- Purpose: Water supply; Discharge from thermal power stations and coal mine; Irrigation
- Status: Operational
- Opening date: 1980
- Built by: Thiess
- Operator: Stanwell Corporation

Dam and spillways
- Type of dam: Earth fill dam
- Impounds: Meandu Creek
- Height (foundation): 22 m (72 ft)
- Length: 450 m (1,480 ft)
- Dam volume: 383×10^{3} m^{3} (13.5×10^{6} cu ft)
- Spillway type: Uncontrolled
- Spillway capacity: 1,492 m^{3}/s (52,700 cu ft/s)

Reservoir
- Total capacity: 3,100 ML (110×10^{6} cu ft)
- Catchment area: 3,970 ha (9,800 acres)
- Surface area: 68 ha (170 acres)

The Meandu Creek Dam is an earth-fill embankment dam built near Yarraman in the Wide Bay–Burnett region of Queensland, Australia. In addition to supply water, the resultant reservoir receives discharges from the cooling towers of the Tarong and Tarong North thermal power stations, and from the nearby coal mine owned by Rio Tinto Coal Australia.

== Overview ==
The dam was completed in 1980 and is 22 metres (72 ft) high and 450 metres (1,480 ft) long. The resultant reservoir has a storage capacity of 3,100 megalitres (110×10^{6} cu ft), covering an area of 69 hectares (170 acres), and a catchment area of 3,970 hectares (9,800 acres).

Releases from Meandu Creek Dam supply downstream irrigators on Meandu Creek. In 2019 Stanwell Corporation (formerly Tarong Energy) temporarily stopped discharges into the creek to allow downstream property owners to repair culverts.

== See also ==
- List of dams and reservoirs in Australia
