= Tarong =

Tarong may refer to:

- Tarong, Queensland
- Tarong Energy
- Tarong National Park
- Tarong North Power Station
- Tarong Power Station
- Tarong railway line
