= Tarong, Queensland =

Tarong
- Suburb
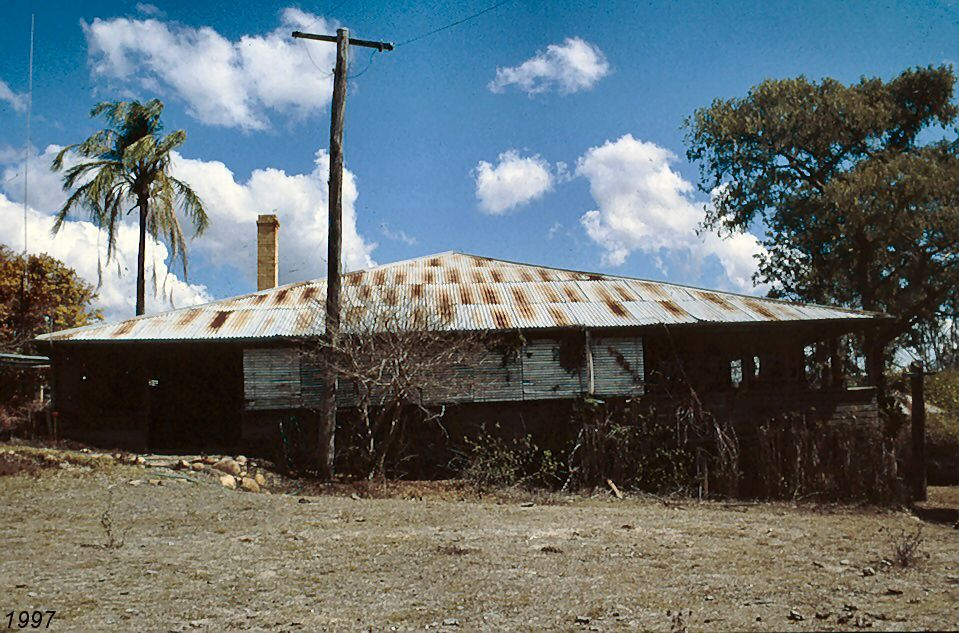
- Tarong Homestead, 1997

- Interactive map of Tarong
- Coordinates: 26.7649°S 151.8822°E
- Country: Australia
- State: Queensland
- LGA: South Burnett Region
- Location: 19.8 km (12.3 mi) SW of Nanango; 31.8 km (19.8 mi) S of Kingaroy; 188 km (117 mi) N of Toowoomba; 193 km (120 mi) NW of Brisbane

Government
  - State electorate: Nanango
  - Federal division: Maranoa

Area
  - Total: 93.3 km^{2} (36.0 sq mi)

Population
  - Total: 193 (2021 census)
  - Density: 2.069/km^{2} (5.358/sq mi)
- Time zone: UTC+10:00 (AEST)
- Postcode: 4615
Suburbs around Tarong
Brooklands	Brooklands	South Nanango
Brooklands	Tarong	South Nanango
Maidenwell	Neumgna	Yarraman

Tarong is a rural locality in the South Burnett Region, Queensland, Australia. The area is known for the Tarong Power Station which is located next to the Meandu Mine. In the 2021 census, Tarong had a population of 193 people.

== History ==
The name Tarong derives from the name of a pastoral run first used in 1850; it is probably based on an Aboriginal word tarum meaning wild lime tree.

In April 1921, two subdivisions at Nanango and Tarong Estate and Township were advertised for auction by John Darley and Isles, Love and Co. The Tarong Estate, twelve miles from Nanango and Tarong Railway Station offered 25 agricultural farms and 62 town allotments while the Grange Estate, eleven miles from Nanango and 18 miles from Kingaroy in the Parish of Booie offered 15 dairy farms.

Tarong State School opened in 1925 and closed circa 1942. In 1951, the school building was relocated to Jonestown West State School.

== Demographics ==
In the 2016 census, Tarong had a population of 181 people.

In the 2021 census, Tarong had a population of 193 people.

== Heritage listings ==
Tarong has a number of heritage-listed sites, including:

- Tarong Homestead, Cooyar Road

== Education ==
There are no schools in Tarong. The nearest government primary schools are Nanango State School in Nanango to the north-east, Yarraman State School in neighbouring Yarraman to the south-east, and Tanduringie State School in Pimpimbudgee to the south-west. The nearest government secondary schools are Yarraman State School (to Year 9) and Nanango State High School (to Year 12) in Nanango.
