= Maidenwell, Queensland =

Maidenwell
- Town
- Interactive map of Maidenwell
- Coordinates: 26.8467°S 151.7996°E
- Country: Australia
- State: Queensland
- LGA: South Burnett Region
- Location: 30.3 km (18.8 mi) SW of Nanango; 43.7 km (27.2 mi) S of Kingaroy; 108 km (67 mi) N of Toowoomba; 205 km (127 mi) NW of Brisbane

Government
  - State electorate: Nanango
  - Federal division: Maranoa

Area
  - Total: 73.4 km^{2} (28.3 sq mi)

Population
  - Total: 227 (2021 census)
  - Density: 3.093/km^{2} (8.010/sq mi)
- Time zone: UTC+10:00 (AEST)
- Postcode: 4615
Localities around Maidenwell
Wengenville	Brooklands	Tarong
Wengenville	Maidenwell	Neumgna
Pimpimbudgee	Pimpimbudgee	Pimpimbudgee

Maidenwell is a rural town and locality in the South Burnett Region, Queensland, Australia. In the 2021 census, the locality of Maidenwell had a population of 227 people.

== History ==
Pioneer settler John King dug the first well in the district, hence the name Maidenwell.

Maidenwell Post Office opened in 1906 (a receiving office named Pinpinbugie had been open from 1900) and closed in 1978.

Peron State School opened on 1 April 1914. In 1934, it was moved to the foot of the Maidenwell Range and was then known as Maidenwell State School. It closed on 18 March 1938. In 1939, it was relocated to 1 mile (1.6 km) south of the town of Maidenwell, reopening there on 26 March 1940, closed on 20 September 1942, and reopened on 23 August 1943. In 1949, the school was relocated to its current location in Pimpimbudgee and renamed Tanduringie State School.

Tureen State School opened in March 1915 and closed in June 1925.

Tandaringie State School opened on 15 April 1915. It closed in December 1932.

Maidenwell Provisional School opened on 24 January 1921. On 16 May 1923, it became Maidenwell State School. In 1923, it was renamed Pimpimbudgee State School. It closed on 29 July 1946.

Maidenwell Provisional School opened in April 1926. In 1934, a new school building was constructed and was opened as Wengenville State School. It closed in 1961.

The Maidenwell Community Library opened in 2000.

== Demographics ==
In the 2011 census, the locality of Maidenwell had a population of 458 people.

In the 2016 census, the locality of Maidenwell had a population of 199 people.

In the 2021 census, the locality of Maidenwell had a population of 227 people.

== Heritage listings ==
Maidenwell has a number of heritage-listed sites, including:

- former King's Boarding House, Maidenwell-Cooyar Road

== Education ==
There are no schools in Maidenwell. The nearest government primary school is Tanduringie State School in neighbouring Pimpimbudgee to the south. The nearest government secondary schools are Yarraman State School (to Year 10) in Yarraman to the east and Nanango State High School (to Year 12) in Nanango to the north-east.

== Amenities ==
The Maidenwell branch of the Queensland Country Women's Association meets at the CWA Hall in Pool Street. The South Burnett Regional Council operates a library at the CWA Hall.

== Attractions ==
Coomba Falls is located about 2 kilometres east of the town. There is a deep cold pool at the base of the falls surrounded by granite cliffs. It is a popular tourist spot for picnicking, swimming, birdwatching and photography.
