= Pidna National Park =

National park in Queensland

- IUCN category II (national park)
- Location within Queensland
- Location: Queensland
- Nearest city: Yarraman, Queensland
- Coordinates: 26°53′29″S 151°58′16″E
- Area: 153 ha (380 acres)
- Established: 2006
- Governing body: Queensland Parks and Wildlife Service

Pidna National Park is a national park in Queensland, Australia. It is located near Yarraman, Queensland.

Pidna National Park is in the Upper Brisbane catchment area. The national park has a temperate climate.
