= Kooralgin, Queensland =

Kooralgin
- Suburb
- Interactive map of Kooralgin
- Coordinates: 26.925°S 151.9327°E
- Country: Australia
- State: Queensland
- LGA: Toowoomba Region
- Location: 16.8 km (10.4 mi) SW of Yarraman; 37.7 km (23.4 mi) S of Nanango; 109 km (68 mi) N of Toowoomba CBD; 182 km (113 mi) NW of Brisbane

Government
  - State electorate: Nanango
  - Federal division: Maranoa

Area
  - Total: 60.4 km^{2} (23.3 sq mi)

Population
  - Total: 47 (2021 census)
  - Density: 0.778/km^{2} (2.015/sq mi)
- Time zone: UTC+10:00 (AEST)
- Postcode: 4402
Suburbs around Kooralgin
Upper Yarraman	Gilla	Gilla
Cooyar	Kooralgin	Gilla
Cooyar	Mount Binga	Mount Binga

Kooralgin is a rural locality in the Toowoomba Region, Queensland, Australia. In the 2021 census, Kooralgin had a population of 47 people.

== Geography ==
Cooyar Creek forms the south-west boundary of the locality before flowing through the locality and exiting to the north-east (Gilla); it eventually becomes a tributary of the Brisbane River.

The main road route through the locality is Cooyar Kooralgin Road, which enters from the south-west (Cooyar) and passes through the locality, changing its name to Yarraman Kooralgin Road, before exiting to the north-east (Gilla).

One section of The Palms National Park is in the west of the locality. Apart from this protected area, the land use is predominantly grazing on native vegetation with crop growing around Cooyar Creek.

== History ==
Kooralgin Provisional School opened on 10 April 1916. It closed in 1923. It reopened in 1930 as a half-time school in conjunction with Claredale Provisional School (meaning they shared a single teacher). About 1932, the Claredale school closed and Kooralgin school became Kooralgin State School. It experienced a number of temporary closures before closing permanently on 28 January 1963. It was at 867 Yarraman Kooralgin Road (26.93095°S 151.94969°E). As at 2023, the former school building was still extant.

== Demographics ==
In the 2016 census, Kooralgin had a population of 46 people.

In the 2021 census, Kooralgin had a population of 47 people.

There are no schools in Kooralgin.
