= Upper Yarraman, Queensland =

Upper Yarraman
- Suburb
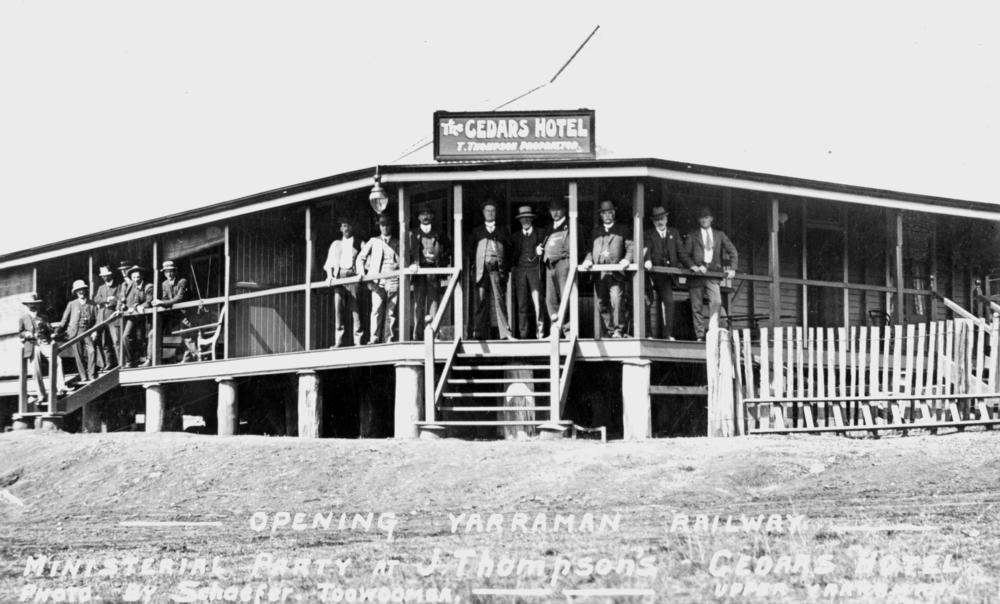
- Cedars Hotel, 1913

- Interactive map of Upper Yarraman
- Coordinates: 26.8897°S 151.8966°E
- Country: Australia
- State: Queensland
- LGA: Toowoomba Region
- Location: 10.8 km (6.7 mi) SW of Yarraman; 31.7 km (19.7 mi) SW of Nanango; 105 km (65 mi) N of Toowoomba; 176 km (109 mi) NW of Brisbane
- Established: 1897

Government
  - State electorate: Nanango
  - Federal division: Maranoa

Area
  - Total: 41.6 km^{2} (16.1 sq mi)

Population
  - Total: 80 (2021 census)
  - Density: 1.92/km^{2} (5.0/sq mi)
- Time zone: UTC+10:00 (AEST)
- Postcode: 4614
Suburbs around Upper Yarraman
Neumgna	Yarraman	Yarraman
Neumgna	Upper Yarraman	Gilla
Cooyar	Cooyar	Kooralgin

Upper Yarraman is a rural locality in the Toowoomba Region, Queensland, Australia. In the 2021 census, Upper Yarraman had a population of 80 people.

== Geography ==
Upper Yarraman is on the Darling Downs.

The New England Highway runs through Upper Yarraman. It is part of the Cooyar Creek catchment, a tributary of the Brisbane River.

== History ==
The area was first surveyed in 1897. It was then opened for selection with a requirement being the land had to be cleared and cultivated.

The name of Yarraman is derived from the aboriginal word meaning horse. Although the origin of the word Yarraman is unknown, it is thought to be derived from the word "yira" which means large teeth.

Yarraman Creek Upper Provisional School opened on 30 January 1905. On 1 January 1909 it became Yarraman Creek Upper State School. Circa 1935 it was renamed Yarraman Upper State School. It closed on 31 December 2002. It was at 130 Upper Yarraman Road (26.8919°S 151.8971°E). The school building has been converted into a residence.

On a road junction of Upper Yarraman became a meeting place. The Cedars hotel first licensee was Jack Thompson in 1913. The hotel was used for the Ministerial Party Luncheon the day after the railway opening in Yarraman in 1913. The hotel burnt down in 1927, was rebuilt, then burnt down again in 1960.

The Upper Yarraman Farmers' Hall, was originally the Phoenix Picture Theatre in Blackbutt. The hall was dismantled and re-erected at its current location in 1945, on a piece of land donated by Mr. Horace Lougheed.

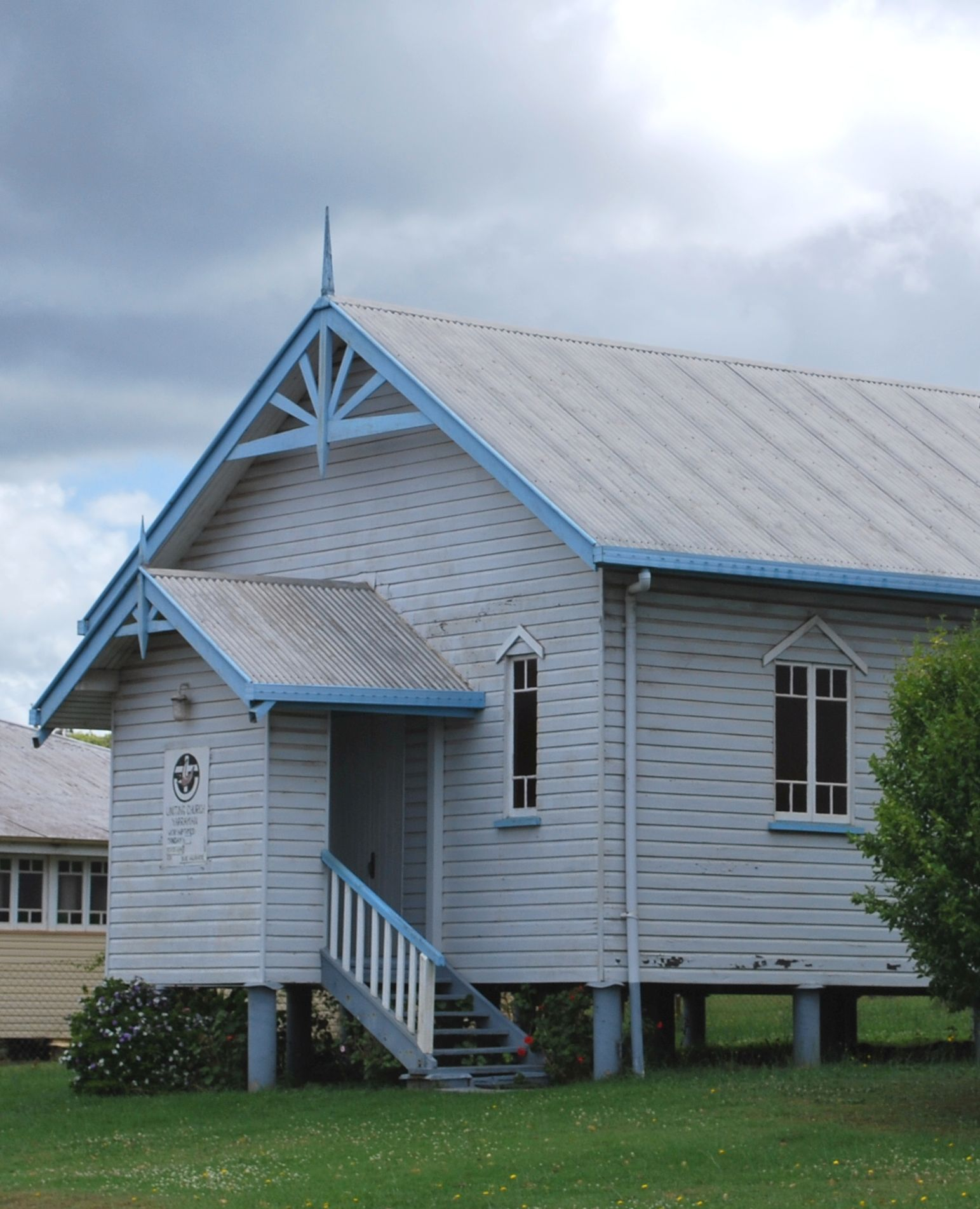
Upper Yarraman Methodist Church, 2010 after its relocation to Yarraman

In January 1922, it was decided to build a Methodist church. In 1965 it was relocated to Yarraman to become the Methodist Church in Yarraman with the former Yarraman Methodist Church becoming the church hall. It is now the Yarraman Uniting Church.

In February 1924, it was decided to establish a trunk line and public telegraph office. The township had a telephone exchange which was used until 1986 and a post office till 1974.

There is a pine forest on the northern side of the Yarraman Creek Valley, just beyond the boundary of Upper Yarraman, which is a plantation of hoop pines planted in around 1939 to 1940.

== Demographics ==
In the 2016 census, Upper Yarraman had a population of 104 people.

In the 2021 census, Upper Yarraman had a population of 80 people.

== Education ==
There are no schools in Upper Yarraman. The nearest government primary schools are Yarraman State School in neighbouring Yarraman to the north-east, Cooyar State School in neighbouring Cooyar to the south, and Tanduringie State School in Pimpimbudgie to the west. The nearest government secondary schools are Yarraman State School (to Year 10) and Nanango State High School in Nanango to the north-east (to Year 12).
