= Neumgna =

- Suburb
- Interactive map of Neumgna
- Coordinates: 26.8455°S 151.8622°E
- Country: Australia
- State: Queensland
- LGA: South Burnett Region
- Location: 27.6 km (17.1 mi) SW of Nanango; 41.0 km (25.5 mi) S of Kingaroy; 121 km (75 mi) N of Toowoomba; 192 km (119 mi) NW of Brisbane

Government
  - State electorate: Nanango
  - Federal division: Maranoa

Area
  - Total: 78.4 km^{2} (30.3 sq mi)

Population
  - Total: 18 (2021 census)
  - Density: 0.230/km^{2} (0.595/sq mi)
- Time zone: UTC+10:00 (AEST)
- Postcode: 4614
Suburbs around Neumgna
Tarong	Tarong	Tarong
Maidenwell	Neumgna	Yarraman
Pimpimbudgee	Cooyar	Upper Yarraman

Neumgna is a rural locality in the South Burnett Region, Queensland, Australia. The north-east part of Neumgna is dominated by the Meandu coal mine. In the 2021 census, Neumgna had a population of 18 people.

== Geography ==
The New England Highway enters the locality from the south-east (Upper Yarraman) and forms part of the south-eastern boundary of the locality before exiting to the south (Cooyar).

The Meandu coal mine is in the north-east of the locality while the Tarong National Park is in the north-west of the locality. Apart from these, the land use is forestry in the south and east of the locality, while the centre of the locality is used for grazing on native vegetation.

== History ==
Neumgna State School opened on 12 July 1920. It closed on 11 February 1955 with local children being conveyed each day to Upper Yarraman State School. The former school site is now part of the mine site (approx 26.8213°S 151.8987°E).

== Demographics ==
In the 2016 census, Neumgna had a population of 9 people.

In the 2021 census, Neumgna had a population of 18 people.

== Education ==
There are no schools in Neumgna. The nearest government primary schools are Tanduringie State School in neighbouring Pimpinbudgee to the south-west and Yarraman State School in neighbouring Yarraman to the east. The nearest government secondary schools are Yarraman State School (to Year 9) and Nanango State High School (to Year 12) in Nanango to the north-east. There is also a Catholic primary school in Nanango and Catholic and Lutheran primary-and-secondary schools in Kingaroy.
