= South Nanango =

- Suburb
- Interactive map of South Nanango
- Coordinates: 26.7399°S 151.9733°E
- Country: Australia
- State: Queensland
- LGA: South Burnett Region
- Location: 5.5 km (3.4 mi) SW of Nanango; 29.9 km (18.6 mi) SE of Kingaroy; 133 km (83 mi) N of Toowoomba; 181 km (112 mi) NW of Brisbane

Government
  - State electorate: Nanango
  - Federal division: Maranoa

Area
  - Total: 101.2 km^{2} (39.1 sq mi)

Population
  - Total: 893 (2021 census)
  - Density: 8.824/km^{2} (22.854/sq mi)
- Time zone: UTC+10:00 (AEST)
- Postcode: 4615
Suburbs around South Nanango
Brooklands	Nanango	South East Nanango
Tarong	South Nanango	South East Nanango
Tarong	Tarong	Yarraman

South Nanango is a rural locality in the South Burnett Region, Queensland, Australia. In the 2021 census, South Nanango had a population of 893 people.

== Geography ==
As the name suggests, South Nanango is a locality south of the town of Nanango. The land is between 400 and 450 metres above sea level. The lower land which is well-watered by many small creeks is used for agriculture, principally grazing cattle. The higher land in the east and south of the locality is the South Nanango State Forest. South Nanango is on a drainage divide running through the locality from the north-east to the south west, with the north-western part of the locality contributing to the Burnett River basin and the south-eastern part of the locality contributing to the Brisbane River basin.

The D'Aguilar Highway (which links Caboolture to Kingaroy) passes through the locality from south to north.

== History ==
Buckland State School opened on 25 October 1909. It closed in 1959. It was located at 13387 D'Aguilar Highway (on the south-western corner with Bucklands Road, 26.7223°S 151.9738°E). There is a sign on the fence with the school's name and years of operation.

== Demographics ==
In the 2016 census, South Nanango had a population of 858 people.

In the 2021 census, South Nanango had a population of 893 people.

== Education ==
There are no schools in South Nanango. The nearest government primary schools are Nanango State School in neighbouring Nanango to the north and Yarraman State School in neighbouring Yarraman to the south-east. The nearest government secondary schools are Nanango State High School (to Year 12) in Nanango and Yarraman State State (to Year 9) in Yarraman.
