= The Palms National Park =

National park in Queensland, Australia

- IUCN category II (national park)
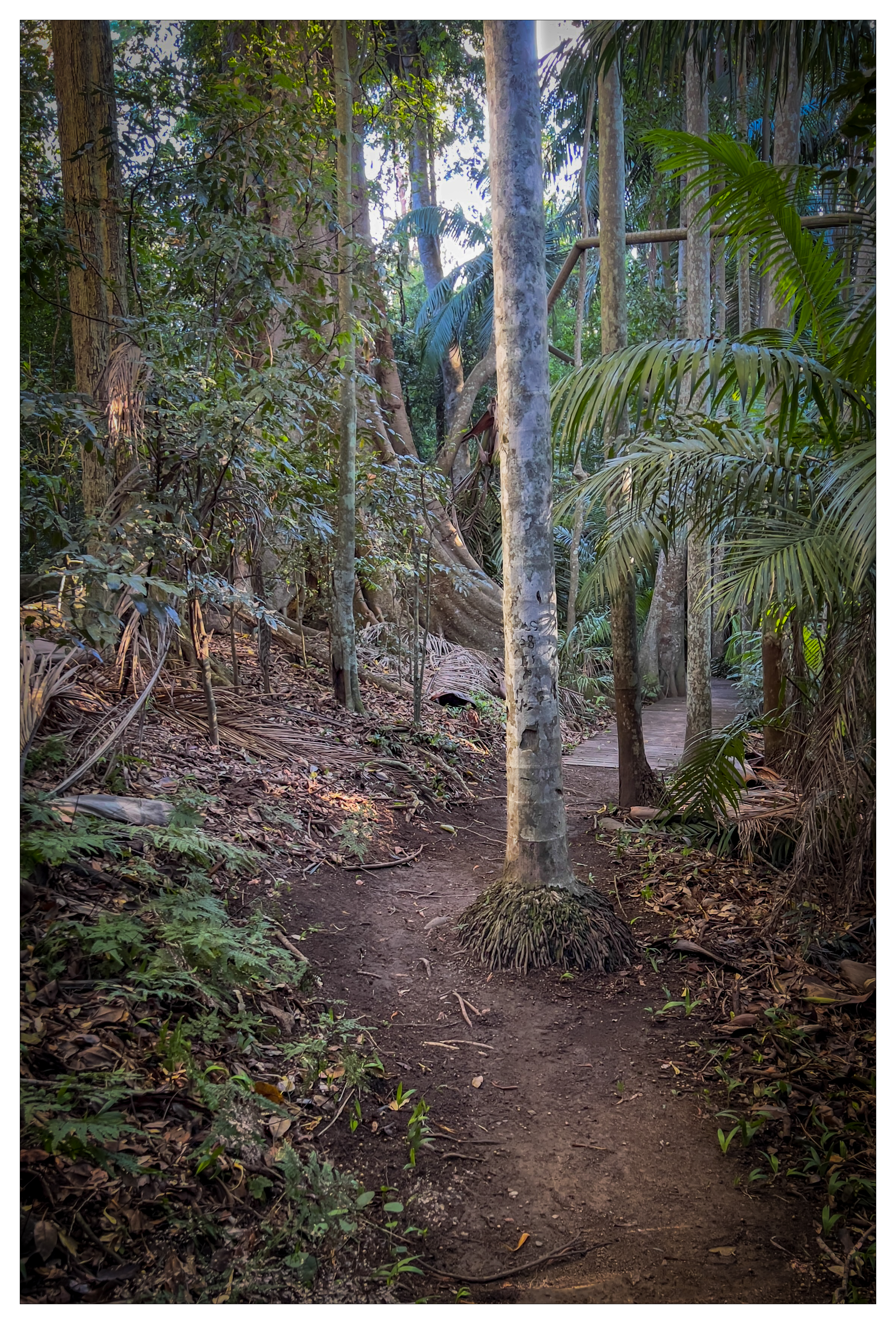
- The Palms National Park, Cooyar, 2023.jpg

- Location within Queensland
- Location: Queensland
- Nearest city: Cooyar, Queensland
- Coordinates: 26°56′05″S 151°52′43″E
- Area: 12.4 ha (31 acres)
- Established: 1950
- Governing body: Queensland Parks and Wildlife Service
- Website: Official website

The Palms is a small national park with two sections, one in Cooyar and the other in Kooralgin, both in the Toowoomba Region, Queensland, Australia. The main feature of the park is spring-fed gully filled with piccabeen palms. Strangler figs, bunya pines and hoop pines also predominate.

== History ==
The 12.4 ha park was proclaimed in 1950.

== Attractions ==
The birdlife in the park is prolific.

No camping is allowed in the park but picnics and bushwalks are catered for.

== See also ==
- Protected areas of Queensland
