= King's Boarding House =

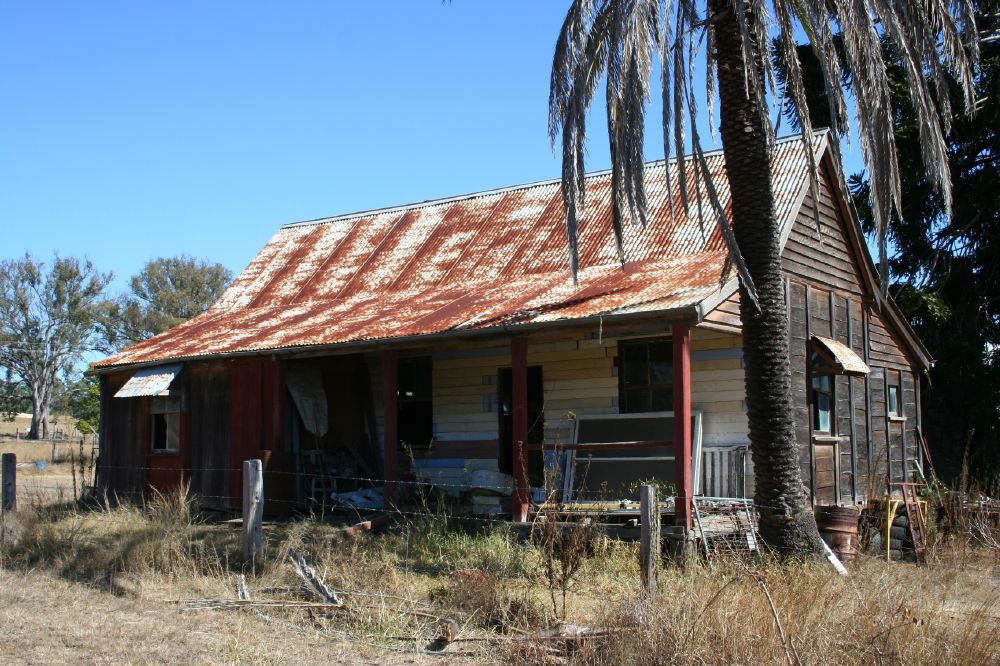
- King's Boarding House, 2008

- Location within Queensland Location within Australia
- 26.8597°S 151.793°E
- Location: Maidenwell-Cooyar Road, Maidenwell, South Burnett Region, Queensland, Australia

History
- Design period: 1870s - 1890s (late 19th century)
- Built: 1889

Queensland Heritage Register
- Official name: King's Boarding House (former)
- Type: state heritage (built)
- Designated: 17 September 2010
- Reference no.: 602747
- Significant period: 1880s onwards
- Significant components: coach house, cellar, kitchen/kitchen house, tank - water (underground)
- Builders: John King

King's Boarding House is a heritage-listed boarding house at Maidenwell-Cooyar Road, Maidenwell, South Burnett Region, Queensland, Australia. It was built in 1889 by John King. It was added to the Queensland Heritage Register on 17 September 2010.

== History ==
The former King's Boarding House, a gabled building of horizontal slab construction with a detached kitchen was built in 1889 by selector John King, on the Maidenwell-Cooyar Rd, Maidenwell.

The area encompassing present day Maidenwell, close to the Bunya Mountains and on the Cooyar Range, was first settled in the post-contact era following the establishment of Tarong Homestead by James Borthwick in 1842. It was a vast holding of approximately 250 sq miles (168.35 sq km) comprising four runs: Tarong, Kunioon, Tureen and Neumgna.

The creation of large holdings such as Tarong played a key role in the development of Queensland's transport network, with mail routes often following tracks and stock routes connecting pastoral properties. By 1849, pastoralists in the Burnett district were petitioning the Postmaster General to establish mail services to their regions. In 1859, the Postmaster-General advertised for tenders for two mail services to Nanango: one via "North Brisbane" and another via Drayton. The Drayton route was operating by 1860 and connected the Rosalie, Cooyar and Tarong pastoral stations before terminating at Nanango.

The establishment of the railway network throughout Queensland from the mid 1860s realigned the way goods and services were transported between destinations, with routes feeding into the railway assuming greater importance. The Western railway line from Toowoomba reached Jondaryan at the end of 1867, with a mail service between Nanango and Jondaryan established soon after, replacing the Drayton-Nanango service while still using much of the earlier route. By 1877, the Nanango correspondent for the Brisbane Courier named Jondaryan railway station as "the chief depot from where goods arrive to this township".

Under the Crown Lands Alienation Act of 1876 approximately 35 square miles (56.33 sq km) of the Neumgna run of Tarong was resumed in 1878, to open the area for conditional selection. On 10 April 1883, John King applied to lease Portion 194, a 640-acre (260 ha) block. King along with his brother James and William McConnell were the first closer settlers in the district.

John King was born in Chalgrove, Oxfordshire, England in 1853, later immigrating to Australia with his parents. While the date of his arrival is undetermined, family history records King working on the Main Range railway and later in a brick factory, after his arrival. King married Mary Chalklin in 1875 at Ipswich and by 1879 had taken out a brand registration in the Parish of Greenmount, Warwick, indicating an involvement with agriculture prior to his selection of land in the South Burnett. Following the death of his wife Mary in 1895, King remarried in 1898 to Caroline Rutsch. Both spouses had two children from their first marriages, and five more children were born at Maidenwell.

After Portion 194 was surveyed in early 1884, John King objected, as the eastern boundary cut off his property's direct access to the Jondaryan-Nanango road. This issue was resolved by excising 84 acres (34 ha) from adjoining Portion 193, the former selection of James King, who had forfeited his lease to take up another selection nearby. Consequently, John King's selection was increased to 724 acres (293 ha), with a frontage along the road.

The conditional selection inspection of 1890 lists among the improvements, a house and outhouses, fencing, ringbarking of 100 acres (40 ha) and 9 acres (3.6 ha) of land under cultivation. A well of 26 feet (7.9 m) depth was also noted, the structure behind the name of "Maidenwell". Initially used by King for his own property, the name Maidenwell later assumed a wider use for the district and subsequent township in the early twentieth century.

The house listed in the 1890 inspection is believed to have been built in 1889, replacing an earlier slab hut that was built some 400 metres (1,300 ft) in from the Nanango road. The building, constructed of horizontal hardwood slabs and weatherboards, had a front verandah, was sheltered by a gabled roof clad in shingles and included a detached kitchen to the rear, connected via a walkway. King utilised stone bonded with lime and loam to construct a fireplace and chimney, and an underground water tank adjacent to the walkway. The space underneath the kitchen was used as a cellar, to store home made wine, jam and preserves, from produce grown on the property. A large mound of spent carbide close to the house indicates the use of this material for lighting.

The Kings capitalised on their residence's close proximity to the road and its location suggests that a commercial use may have been intended for the building when constructed. By at least 1899, and possibly earlier, the Kings were operating a boarding house, the Pinpinbugie Receiving Office and a store from their residence.

The precise date coach services were established between Nanango and Jondaryan is unclear. By 1893 Michael Collins operated the Nanango- Jondaryan mail service twice a week by buggy and a coach run was operating between the townships by 1897. Coach routes were broken up into "stages" or "posts", and the amenities offered to travellers at such places, were a critical component of road infrastructure throughout Queensland. While the size and range of services offered at coach stops varied, essentially they were places where horses were changed and where establishments offered food, drink and accommodation.

Coach stops were important spaces for travellers to socialise, shelter from inclement conditions and obtain information on the condition of the road ahead.

The setting of King's Boarding House, above a water crossing and on level ground highly visible and close to the road, follows the pattern found at similar coach stops at Bankfoot House, Glass House Mountains and the "Stonehouse" at Moore. Addressing the road on its east facing gable, the name 'King's Boarding House', can still be faintly made out on the building.

Although John King was listed as the Receiving Office Keeper, his wife Caroline is thought to have been responsible for duties attached to the office, with about 120 letters received and despatched each month. In 1906 the office was renamed the Maidenwell Receiving Office. Part of the front verandah of the homestead was enclosed to form the office, with a mail slot inserted into the verandah wall.

The King's store operated from the cellar beneath the detached kitchen and serviced the local settler population, which increased as further land was made available for selection in the Parishes of Neumgna and Tureen, from 1903 to 1914. An interesting detail of the former store area is the inscription of "Big Druth (sic) 1902" together with a date and the initials "J.K.", which appears to a record of the devastating drought that occurred throughout Australia in the early years of the twentieth century.

Branch railway line extensions to Nanango (1911), Cooyar (via Oakey, 1913) and Tarong (1915) ended the role of Jondaryan railway station as the railhead for the district. In 1906 and 1907 King selected Portions 50 and 52, adjoining the north-western boundary of his property, and it was here that the small settlement of Maidenwell came to be established in the 1910s. The services that King had offered for travellers and local settlers at his original selection were eventually transferred to this new location. In 1913 King built the Maidenwell Hotel, opening in early 1914. The Maidenwell Receiving Office remained at King's original premises until 1918, when John Castree, who was operating a store first established by King in 1914, became the mail receiving officer.

John King died in 1934, with Portion 194 left to his sons Walter and James. Walter King assumed full title in 1939, later building a residence near the boarding house, and was involved in farming and dairying on the property. In 1970 Portion 194 was subdivided into two lots, with the former boarding house and later residence included within the boundary of Lot 1. In 1972, Walter's son Donald became the titleholder of both lots, retaining ownership of Lot 1 until 2000, when it was bought by the present owners.

While the roof is now clad in corrugated metal sheeting and some alterations have occurred internally and to the exterior verandah wall, the former King's Boarding House remains relatively intact and is currently used for storage.

== Description ==
The former King's Boarding House is located on an elevated parcel of land overlooking the Maidenwell-Cooyar Road, Maidenwell. It consists of two structures connected by a covered walkway. The structure to the east overlooking the road is the original boarding house while the structure to the west is the original kitchen.

The landscape around the coach house is scrubby with the only established plantings being a large bunya pine (Araucaria bidwillii) to the north of the kitchen and a palm tree to the north of the boarding house. Located in the southern courtyard of the complex bounded by the kitchen, walkway and boarding house are the remains of a stone lined well. A mound of spent carbide is located at the southern end of the kitchen building.

The coach house complex including the boarding house, kitchen and walkway are all equally elevated above the ground. The boarding house consists of a simple rectilinear planned core with an enclosed verandah to the west and semi-enclosed verandah to the east. A gable roof form covers the main core of the building while simple lean-to roofs cover the verandahs.

The kitchen structure consists of a central rectilinear planned core covered by a gable roof. A simple lean-to roof covers the semi-enclosed verandah space to the west. No verandah exists to the east of the structure; however, remains of floor framing indicate that such a structure may once have existed on this side of the kitchen. A fire place and associated chimney constructed from stone bonded with lime and loam adjoins the northern end of the kitchen.

The walkway between the boarding house and kitchen is covered by a curved roof. All roofs to the coach house complex are clad with corrugated metal sheeting.

The coach house complex is established on a floor framing system consisting of hardwood stumps, rough sawn hardwood drop log bearers, pit sawn hardwood joists and floor boards. Exterior walls to both buildings are timber framed with the dominant wall construction for both structures being a system of vertically expressed hardwood posts housed into bed log bearers and extended up to meet a hardwood top plate. Smaller twin sections of timber are fixed to posts to create rebates running the length of the post. Pit sawn timber slabs are stacked horizontally into these rebates to create the wall membrane.

Wall construction differs across the coach house complex. In the kitchen building the wall to the semi enclosed southern verandah is constructed from rough sawn vertical timber slabs spanning from the ground to the pitching point of the lean-to roof. In the boarding house the southern end of the east facing verandah has been enclosed with butt jointed pit sawn hardwood boards spanning vertically from floor level to the pitching point of the lean-to verandah roof. The eastern exterior wall to the boarding house is clad with dressed tongue and groove timber boards.

At the gable and lean-to roof ends of both the boarding house and kitchen timber framing is extended from wall top plates to the under side of the timber framed roof structures. These wall areas are externally clad with hardwood weatherboards. Remnant painted signage that reads "King's Boarding House" is just visible on the southern gable end of the boarding house building.

Some windows to the coach house complex are now missing, those extant include a combination of double hung timber framed windows to the boarding house and timber framed fixed and casement windows to the kitchen. Windows to the northern, western and eastern elevations of the boarding house are protected from the weather by timber framed awnings sheeted with corrugated iron.

Internally both buildings reveal clear evidence of the manner in which they were originally configured despite sections of internal wall and ceiling linings being removed.

In the boarding house remnant hardwood partitions indicate that both the central core of the building and the enclosed southern verandah were broken up into a number of rooms. The enclosed section of the northern verandah accommodated the post office. Surviving fabric indicates that the ceiling and internal partitions were lined with timber tongue and groove boards while internal surfaces to external walls remained unlined revealing the timber post and slab style of construction.

The kitchen building includes an open plan central core complete with stone fireplace for cooking and a semi-enclosed western verandah and sub-floor cellar. An intact high level partition indicates that the core of the building may once have been divided into two rooms. The verandah is set at ground level and has an earth floor. Similar to the external walls of the verandah, the cellar walls are constructed of vertically stood timber slabs set in between timber stumps and spanning from ground level to meet bearers above. This cellar is accessed via a set of timber framed doors.

The timber framed roof structure is exposed in the core of the kitchen building and it is not clear if the ceiling was lined. There is no evidence of internal linings to the external walls of the kitchen building and as with the boarding house the timber post and slab wall construction is expressed internally as it is externally.

== Heritage listing ==
The former King's Boarding House was listed on the Queensland Heritage Register on 17 September 2010 having satisfied the following criteria.

The place is important in demonstrating the evolution or pattern of Queensland's history.

King's Boarding House (1889) is important in demonstrating the pattern of development in the South Burnett associated with the beginnings of closer settlement in the region from the 1880s. In addition to being a family residence, by 1899, the place operated as a boarding house for travellers on the Jondaryan-Nanango route, and as a mail receiving office and store for the growing settler community, until the establishment of the Maidenwell township in the 1910s.

King's Boarding House is important in illustrating the evolution of transport and communications links in the Wide Bay-Burnett district. Located on a road in use as mail route by the 1850s, the provision of a boarding house for travellers, and a receiving office and store demonstrates the expansion of roadside services along the route in response to the establishment of coach services and increased closer settlement in the district during the 1890s.

The place demonstrates rare, uncommon or endangered aspects of Queensland's cultural heritage.

King's Boarding House is important as a once common, now uncommon surviving example of a coach stop established on a historically important travel route. Coach stops/changing stations and the services they provided were a critical component of road infrastructure throughout Queensland, prior to the emergence of the motor vehicle in the twentieth century. While some alterations have occurred over time, the place is relatively intact and retains sufficient fabric in its layout and materials to demonstrate its functions as a boarding house, mail receiving office and store.

The place has potential to yield information that will contribute to an understanding of Queensland's history.

King's Boarding House is important for its potential to contribute to our understanding of horizontal timber slab construction, and to assist in the comparative analysis of similar places built in 19th century Queensland.

The place is important in demonstrating the principal characteristics of a particular class of cultural places.

King's Boarding House is an important surviving example of a coach stop established on a historically important travel route. Its setting, along a flat section of a predominantly hilly road, easily visible to travellers and near a water crossing, is a good example of a favourable site for a coach stop/changing station on a coach route. While some alterations have occurred over time, the place is relatively intact and retains sufficient fabric in its layout and materials to demonstrate its functions as a boarding house, mail receiving office and store.

The place is important because of its aesthetic significance.

King's Boarding House is important for its strong aesthetic appeal. Located in a quiet rural setting, the place has been a prominent roadside landmark on the Maidenwell-Cooyar Rd for well over a century.
