= Teelah =

Locality in Queensland, Australia

- Suburb
- Interactive map of Teelah
- Coordinates: 26.7733°S 152.1155°E
- Country: Australia
- State: Queensland
- LGA: South Burnett Region
- Location: 48.0 km (29.8 mi) SSW of Nanango; 72.4 km (45.0 mi) SW of Kingaroy; 114 km (71 mi) N of Toowoomba; 159 km (99 mi) NW of Brisbane

Government
  - State electorate: Nanango
  - Federal division: Maranoa

Area
  - Total: 43.7 km^{2} (16.9 sq mi)

Population
  - Total: 90 (2021 census)
  - Density: 2.06/km^{2} (5.33/sq mi)
- Time zone: UTC+10:00 (AEST)
- Postcode: 4314
Suburbs around Teelah
South East Nanango	East Nanango	Avoca Vale
South East Nanango	Teelah	Taromeo
Yarraman	Taromeo	Taromeo

Teelah is a rural locality in the South Burnett Region, Queensland, Australia. In the 2021 census, Teelah had a population of 90 people.

== Geography ==
Teelah has the following mountains:

- Goat Mountain (26.7599°S 152.0801°E) 357 metres (1,171 ft) above sea level
- Mount Mellera (26.7723°S 152.1140°E) 461 metres (1,512 ft) above sea level

There is a small area of rural residential properties in the south-west of the locality, but otherwise the land use is grazing on native vegetation.

== History ==
On 1 February 2018, Teelah's postcode changed from 4306 to 4314.

== Demographics ==
In the 2016 census, Teelah had a population of 68 people.

In the 2021 census, Teelah had a population of 90 people.

== Education ==
There are no schools in Teelah. The nearest government primary schools are Nanango State School in Nanango to the north-west and Blackbutt State School in Blackbutt to the south. The nearest government secondary schools are Nanango State High School (to Year 12) in Nanango and Yarraman State School (to Year 9) in neighbouring Yarraman to the south-west.
