= Stanwell Corporation =

Australian power company

Stanwell Corporation Limited
- Type: Government business enterprise
- Industry: Energy
- Headquarters: Brisbane, Australia
- Area served: Queensland
- Key people: Michael O'Rourke (CEO)
- Products: Energy
- Revenue: ▼ A$3,311.2 million (2024)
- Operating income: ▲ A$874.4 million (2024)
- Net income: ▲ A$594.4 million (2024)
- Total assets: ▼ A$5,698.0 million (2024)
- Total equity: ▲ A$1,423.5 million (2024)
- Owner: Queensland Government
- Number of employees: 900
- Website: www.stanwell.com

Stanwell Corporation is a Queensland Government-owned corporation which is the state's largest electricity generator and Australia’s third-largest greenhouse gas emitter.

Stanwell owns and operates a portfolio of electricity generation assets in Queensland including two of the youngest and most efficient coal-fired power stations in Australia, being Stanwell Power Station in Rockhampton and Tarong North Power Station in the South Burnett region.

The company employs approximately 900 people across various sites in Queensland. The two shareholding ministers are David Janetzki in his capacity as Treasurer and Minister for Energy, and Ros Bates in her capacity as Minister for Finance and Trade.

== Major assets ==
Major assets owned and operated by Stanwell include:

- Stanwell Power Station, with 300 MW grid battery (under construction)
- Tarong Power Station, with 300 MW grid battery
- Tarong North Power Station
- Meandu Mine
- Wambo Wind Farm (50:50 joint venture with Cubico Sustainable Investments, under construction)

On 31 October 2019, ownership of Stanwell's low and no emission power stations was transferred to CleanCo Queensland. This includes the gas-fired Swanbank E Power Station and the three Far North Queensland hydro facilities (Kareeya, Barron Gorge and Koombooloomba). Windy Hill Wind Farm in Queensland and Toora Wind Farm in Victoria were owned by Stanwell but were sold to Transfield Services in 2007. The company also subsequently sold Emu Downs Wind Farm in Western Australia.

Following a review by the Treasurer of Queensland of the state's electricity sector in 2010, Tarong Energy was amalgamated into Stanwell Corporation on 1 July 2011.

The Mackay Gas Turbine was decommissioned in April 2021 and no longer supplies grid power to the National Electricity Market.

== History ==
Stanwell was established in 1997 as a Queensland Government-owned corporation, and has a history of owning and managing a wide range of generating assets including gas, pumped hydro and the first wind farm constructed in Queensland.

The Tarong power stations were commissioned between 1984-1986. Tarong is one of Australia's most efficient power stations supplying around 20 per cent of Queensland's energy needs.

Meandu Mine provides the coal to the Tarong power stations as its sole customer. Work first began on the mine in 1978 after the Queensland Government made the decision to go ahead with the construction of the adjacent Tarong Power Station. In 1984, the mine began regular deliveries to the power station and ownership of Meandu Mine was transferred to Stanwell from Tarong Energy in July 2011.

Stanwell Power Station was commissioned between 1993-1996. The station supplies around 10 per cent of Queensland's energy needs and is one of the most efficient and automated subcritical coal-fired power stations in Australia.

Coal for the Stanwell Power Station comes mainly from the Curragh Coal Mine in Central Queensland, operated by Coronado, with supplementary coal from other Queensland producers as needed.

== Management ==
Stanwell CEO Michael O'Rourke was appointed in 2021 following the departure of Richard van Breda. Paul Binsted has been Chair of the Board since 2020.

== Controversies ==
In 2016, the Department of Environment and Heritage Protection began an investigation into Coal Reuse, a fly ash disposal company employed by Stanwell. The investigation stemmed from allegations it had misused waste material generated at the Tarong and Tarong North power stations. The department also revealed that Stanwell had twice been fined for breaches of environmental approvals.

In the same year, executives at Stanwell were criticised by the then-state opposition for receiving performance bonuses after Coal Reuse had been ordered into liquidation for defaulting on its payments to subcontractors. A spokesperson for Stanwell said that the company would not compensate subcontractors who had been left out of pocket, and that it would "not be an appropriate use of taxpayers money".
