= South East Nanango, Queensland =

South East Nanango
- Suburb
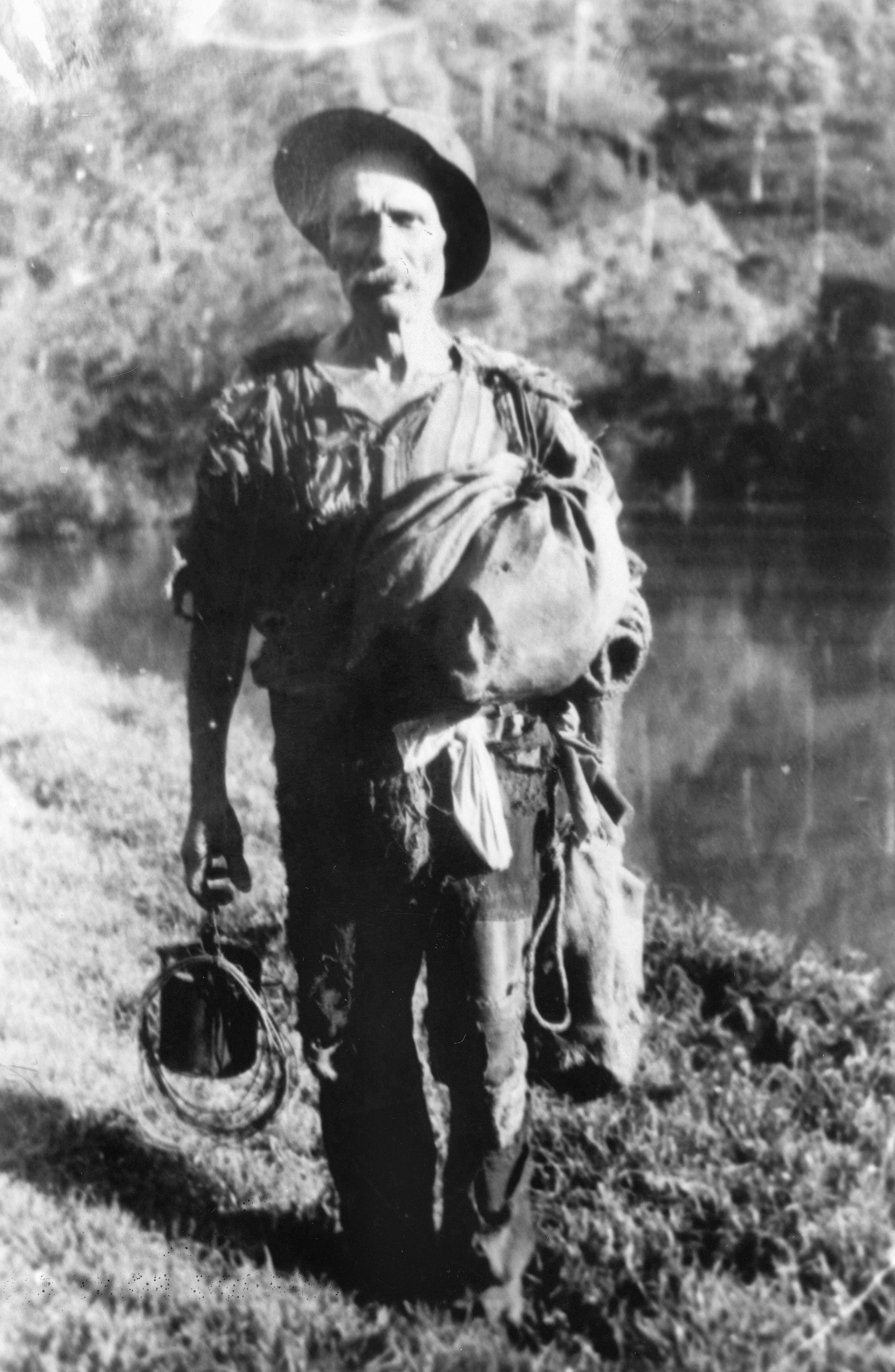
- Peter Rossiter at the Seven Mile goldfields

- Interactive map of South East Nanango
- Coordinates: 26.7344°S 152.0538°E
- Country: Australia
- State: Queensland
- LGA: South Burnett Region
- Location: 6.1 km (3.8 mi) SSE of Nanango; 30.5 km (19.0 mi) SE of Kingaroy; 143 km (89 mi) N of Toowoomba; 200 km (120 mi) NW of Brisbane

Government
  - State electorate: Nanango
  - Federal division: Maranoa

Area
  - Total: 47.3 km^{2} (18.3 sq mi)

Population
  - Total: 344 (2021 census)
  - Density: 7.273/km^{2} (18.84/sq mi)
- Time zone: UTC+10:00 (AEST)
- Postcode: 4615
Suburbs around South East Nanango
Nanango	East Nanango	East Nanango
South Nanango	South East Nanango	Teelah
Yarraman	Yarraman	Teelah

South East Nanango is a rural locality in the South Burnett Region, Queensland, Australia. In the 2021 census, South East Nanango had a population of 344 people.

== Geography ==
Cooyar Creek forms the south-eastern boundary of the locality, while its tributary Yarraman Creek forms most of the southern boundary. The Old Yarraman Road is the western boundary.

Seven Mile is a neighbourhood in the south of the locality (26.75°S 152.05°E).

== History ==
The neighbourhood of Seven Mile is the site of the Seven Mile Diggings, a goldfield active in the late 1800s. The first report of gold found there was in March 1867 at a place described as seven miles from the town of Nanango by James Nash (who later discovered the Gympie Goldfields). Many people immediately came to try to find gold, but little gold was found. However, the goldfield continued to attract hopeful miners until around 1900.

The locality was officially named and bounded on 5 March 1999.

== Demographics ==
In the 2016 census, South East Nanango had a population of 294 people.

In the 2021 census, South East Nanango had a population of 344 people.

== Education ==
There are no schools in South East Nanango. The nearest government primary schools are Nanango State School in neighbouring Nanango to the north-west and Yarraman State School in neighbouring Yarraman to the south-west. The nearest government secondary schools are Nanango State High School in Nanango and Yarraman State School (to Year 9) in Yarraman.
