= Coomba Falls =

- Location within Queensland
- Location: Maidenwell, Queensland, Australia
- Coordinates: 26°51′01″S 151°48′56″E
- Type: Plunge
- Elevation: 444 m (1,457 ft)
- Total height: 4 m (13 ft)
- Number of drops: 1
- Longest drop: 4 m (13 ft)
- Watercourse: Tanduringie Creek

Coomba Falls is a waterfall located 2 km east of the small town of Maidenwell in the South Burnett Region of Queensland, Australia.

There is a deep cold pool at the base of the falls surrounded by granite cliffs. It is a popular tourist spot for picnicking, swimming, birdwatching and photography.

== See also ==
- List of waterfalls
- List of waterfalls in Australia
