= Smith-Williams-Durham Boarding House =

- U.S. National Register of Historic Places
- Location within North Carolina Location within the United States
- Location: 247 5th Ave. West, Hendersonville, North Carolina
- Coordinates: 35°19′3″N 82°27′46″W
- Area: 0.4 acres (0.16 ha)
- Built: 1909, 1918
- Architectural style: Classical Revival
- MPS: Hendersonville MPS
- NRHP reference No.: 89000032
- Added to NRHP: February 24, 1989

Smith-Williams-Durham Boarding House was a historic boarding house located at Hendersonville, Henderson County, North Carolina. It was built about 1909, and was raised to two-stories and remodeled in 1918. It was a rambling frame former dwelling with Classical Revival style design elements. It had a low hipped roof with extended and bracketed eaves and a single tiered wraparound porch. It has been demolished.

It was listed on the National Register of Historic Places in 1989.
