= Fultah Fisher's Boarding House =

1922 American film by Frank Capra

- The full film. Fultah Fisher's Boarding House
- Directed by: Frank Capra
- Written by: Frank Capra; Walter Montague
- Based on: "The Ballad of Fisher's Boarding-House" by Rudyard Kipling
- Produced by: Walter Montague
- Starring: Mildred Owens; Ethan Allen; Olaf Skavlan
- Edited by: Frank Capra
- Production company: Fireside Productions
- Distributed by: Pathé Exchange
- Release date: April 2, 1922 (USA)
- Running time: 12 minutes
- Country: United States
- Language: Silent (English intertitles)
- Budget: $1,700

Fultah Fisher's Boarding House is a 1922 American silent short film and the first film directed by Frank Capra. Based on a poem by Rudyard Kipling, the film is about a prostitute living at a boarding house who provokes a fight that leads to the death of a sailor.

== Plot ==
Fultah Fisher operates a boarding house serving seamen passing through the port. A local woman known as Anne of Austria has had relationships with several sailors and is currently involved with Salem Hardieker, a Bostonian. When Anne becomes interested in a new arrival, Hans, he rejects her, aware of her association with Salem.

== Cast ==
- Mildred Owens as Anne of Austria
- Ethan Allen as Salem Hardieker
- Olaf Skavlan as Hans the Dane

== Production ==
Frank Capra, on his first attempt at making a film, managed to write, cast, direct and edit the film all on his own. The film was shot in San Francisco.
