= Pimpimbudgee, Queensland =

Pimpimbudgee
- Suburb
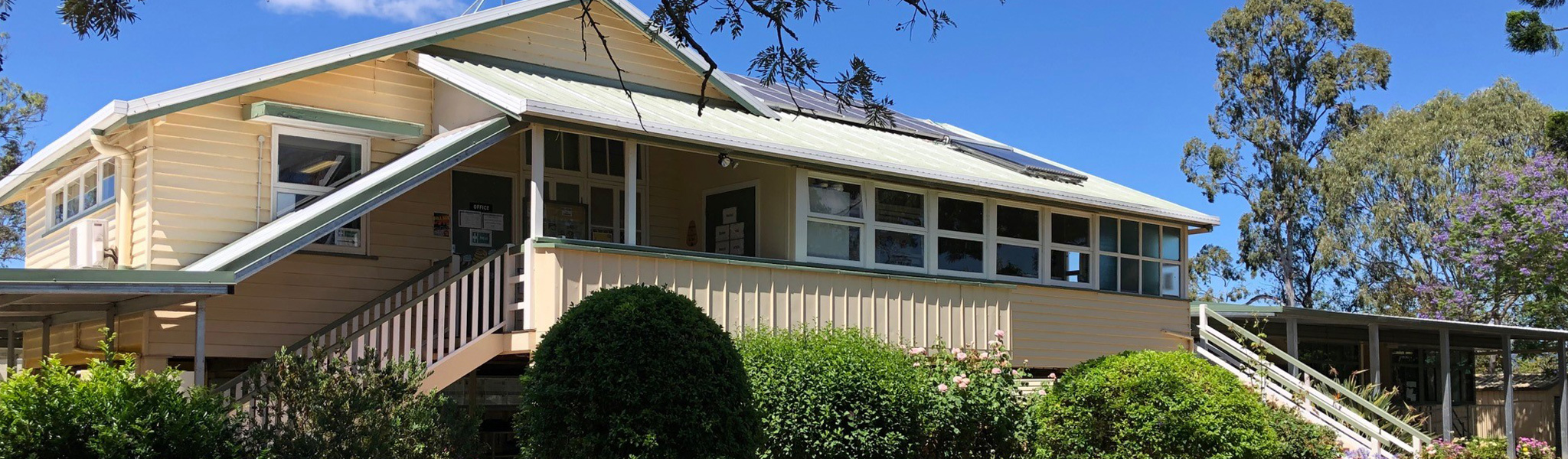
- Tanduringie State School, 2025

- Interactive map of Pimpimbudgee
- Coordinates: 26.8983°S 151.7608°E
- Country: Australia
- State: Queensland
- LGA: South Burnett Region
- Location: 25.4 km (15.8 mi) WSW of Yarraman; 35.7 km (22.2 mi) SW of Nanango; 49.1 km (30.5 mi) S of Kingaroy; 103 km (64 mi) N of Toowoomba; 191 km (119 mi) NW of Brisbane

Government
  - State electorate: Nanango
  - Federal division: Maranoa

Area
  - Total: 86.0 km^{2} (33.2 sq mi)

Population
  - Total: 61 (2021 census)
  - Density: 0.709/km^{2} (1.837/sq mi)
- Time zone: UTC+10:00 (AEST)
- Postcode: 4615
Suburbs around Pimpimbudgee
Wengenville	Maidenwell	Maidenwell
Bunya Mountains	Pimpimbudgee	Neumgna
Upper Cooyar Creek	Upper Cooyar Creek	Cooyar

Pimpimbudgee is a rural locality in the South Burnett Region, Queensland, Australia. In the 2021 census, Pimpimbudgee had a population of 61 people.

== History ==
Peron State School opened on 1 April 1914. In 1934, it was moved to the foot of the Maidenwell Range and was then known as Maidenwell State School. It closed on 18 March 1938. In 1939 it was relocated to 1 mile (1.6 km) south of the town of Maidenwell, reopening there on 26 March 1940, closed on 20 September 1942, and reopened on 23 August 1943. In 1949, the school was relocated to its current location in Pimpimbudgee and renamed Tanduringie State School.

Maidenwell Provisional School opened on 24 January 1921. On 16 May 1923, it became Maidenwell State School. In 1923 it was renamed Pimpimbudgee State School. It closed on 29 July 1946. It was at 519-527 Beare Road (26.87529°S 151.73201°E).

== Demographics ==
In the 2016 census, Pimpimbudgee had a population of 72 people.

In the 2021 census, Pimpimbudgee had a population of 61 people.

== Education ==
Tanduringie State School is a government primary (Prep–6) school for boys and girls at 32 Tanduringie School Road (26.8916°S 151.7954°E). In 2018, the school had an enrolment of 38 students with 4 teachers (2 full-time equivalent) and 5 non-teaching staff (3 full-time equivalent).

The nearest government secondary school is Yarraman State School in Yarraman to the north-east which offers secondary education to Year 9. For secondary education to Year 12, the nearest government school is Nanango State High School in Nanango to the north-east.
