= Bogan Boarding House =

- U.S. National Register of Historic Places
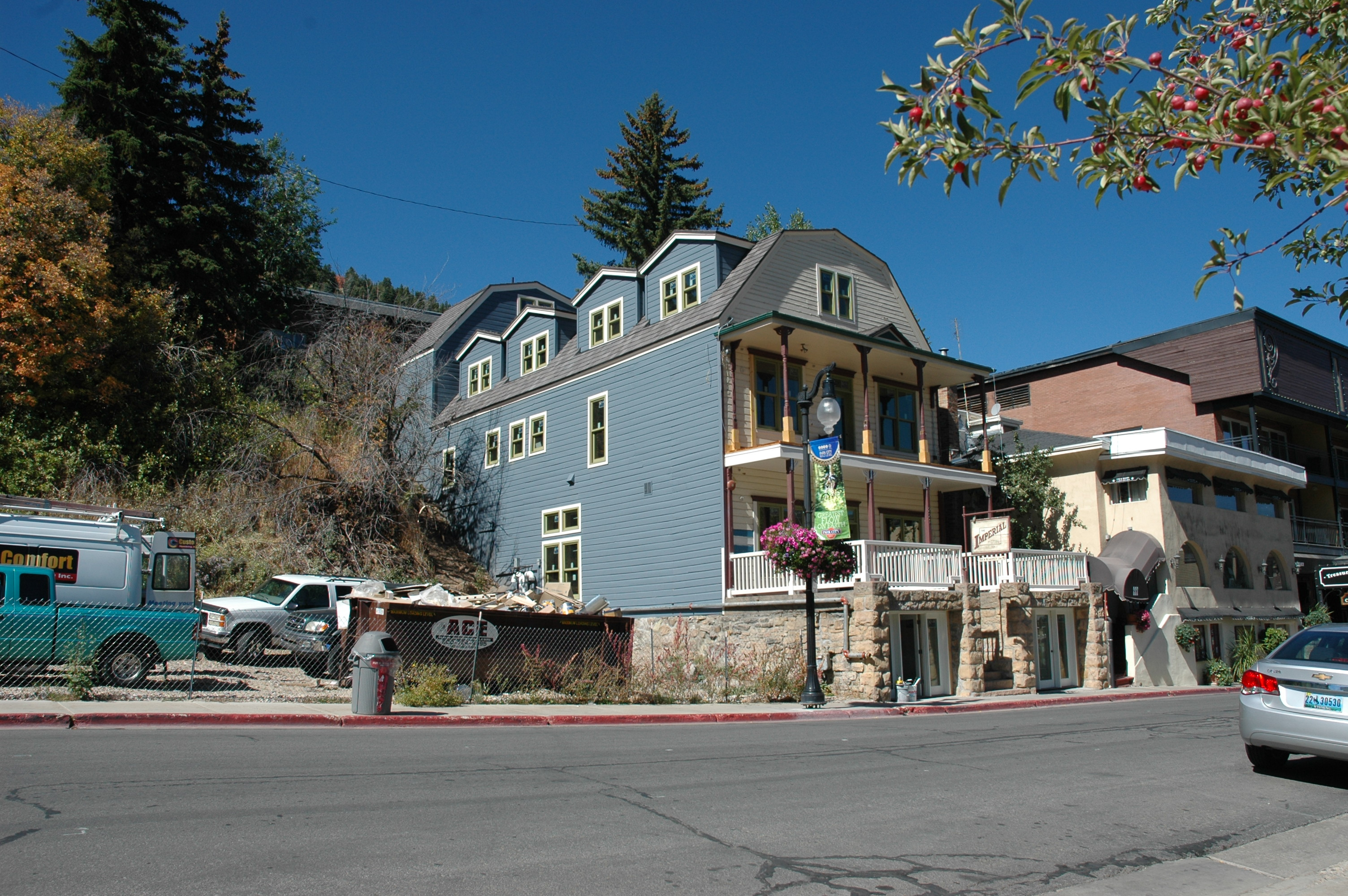

- Location within Utah Location within the United States
- Location: 221 Main St., Park City, Utah
- Coordinates: 40°38′29″N 111°29′37″W
- Area: less than one acre
- Built: 1904
- MPS: Mining Boom Era Houses TR
- NRHP reference No.: 84000154
- Added to NRHP: October 22, 1984

The Bogan Boarding House, at 221 Main St. in Park City, Utah, was built in c. 1904. It was listed on the National Register of Historic Places in 1984.

It was deemed significant as one of only four boarding houses surviving in Park City from its mining era, and also as one of only four built in town after a 1901 legislative bill cancelled the right of mine owners to require miners to live in company-owned boarding houses up near their mines (unless married and living with wife/family in town).
