= Stanwell Power Station =

Power station in Queensland, Australia

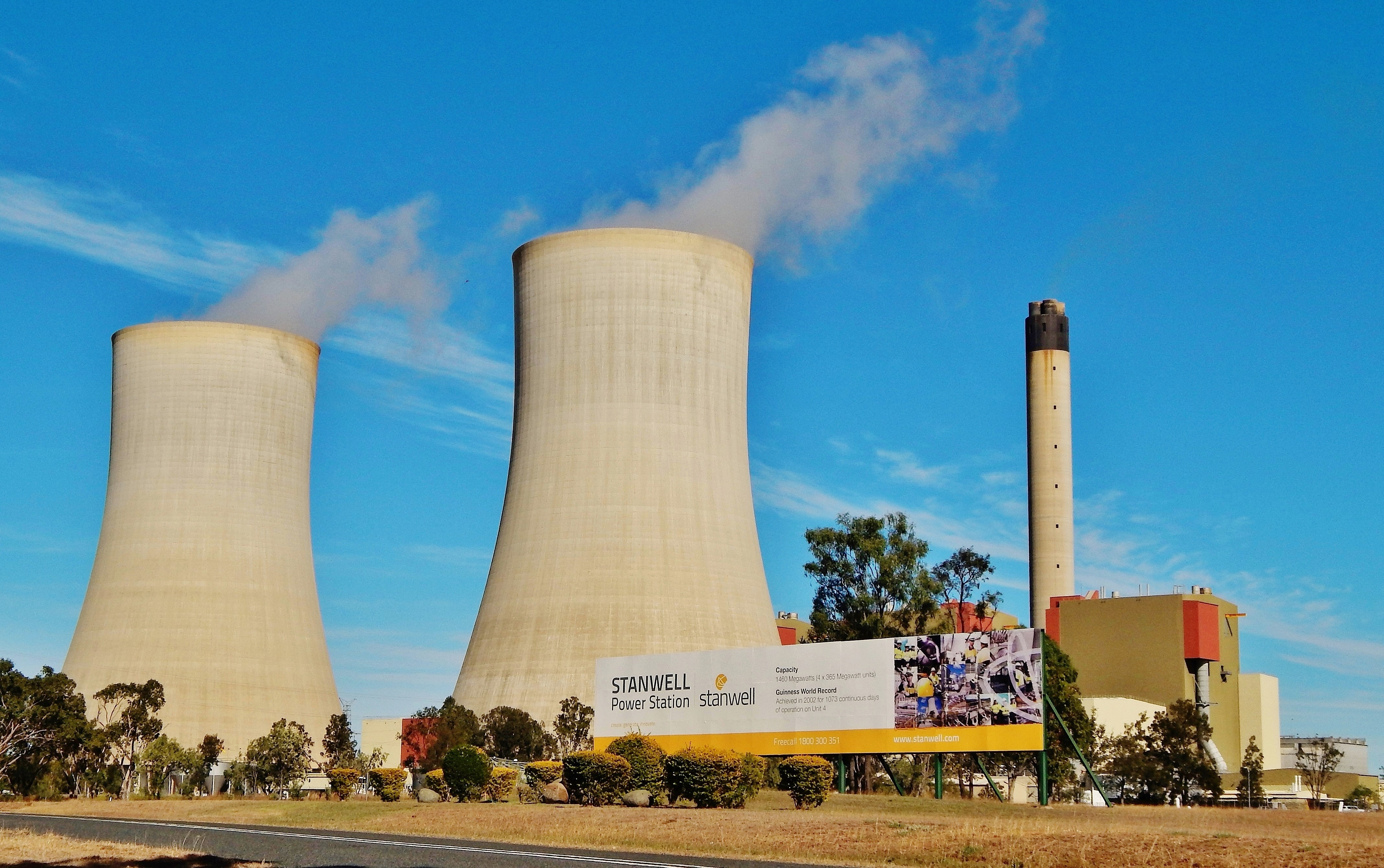
- Stanwell Power Station, 2017
- Country: Australia
- Location: Stanwell, Rockhampton Region
- Coordinates: 23°30′35″S 150°19′7″E
- Status: Operational
- Commission date: 1993 - 1996
- Owner: Stanwell Corporation

Thermal power station
- Primary fuel: Coal

Power generation
- Nameplate capacity: 1,445 MW

Stanwell Power Station is a government-owned coal-fired power generation station located in Stanwell, 23 kilometres (14 mi) south-west of Rockhampton, Queensland, Australia. At the time of construction, it was one of the largest industrial developments undertaken in Queensland. With a capacity to generate 1,445 megawatts (MW), Stanwell Power Station supplies electricity for distribution to customers via the state's high voltage electricity grid.

== History ==
The station is located on 4,000 acres (1,600 hectares) of land. Construction of the station took seven years, with infrastructure built to withstand cyclonic winds. The first unit at Stanwell was commissioned in 1992, and the station became fully operational in 1996.

== Fuel ==
Coal is transport via rail from several Central Queensland coal mines. About 4 million tons of coal are used each year.

== Design ==
There are four generating units at Stanwell Power Station. The four units and their components are housed in a 20 storey boiler house and a turbine hall the length of three football fields. The power station is highly automated using only half the workforce that a plant of its size would usually use. These innovations in unattended operation have been recognized both nationally and internationally. Stanwell Power Station previously held the world record at 1,073 days of continuous operation on Unit 4. This was surpassed in 2021 by Canadian public entity Ontario Power Generation's Darlington Nuclear Generating Station Unit 1, which ran for 1,106 days continuous.

The station features a 210-metre-high-chimney stack which was constructed using approximately 750,000 bricks. The station has two cooling towers, each stands 130 metres high (about the height of a 40-storey building) and is 100 metres in diameter. Fifteen thousand cubic metres of concrete was poured for each tower. The plume seen coming from the cooling towers is steam, lost through evaporation during the water-cooling process.

== Additional facilities ==
The Queensland government and Stanwell decided to build a 1 MW / 10 MWh iron redox flow battery. Construction of a 300 MW / 1,200 MWh battery storage power station at AU$747 million for 2027 started in 2024.

== See also ==
- List of active power stations in Queensland
