= Nortonia Boarding House =

- U.S. National Register of Historic Places
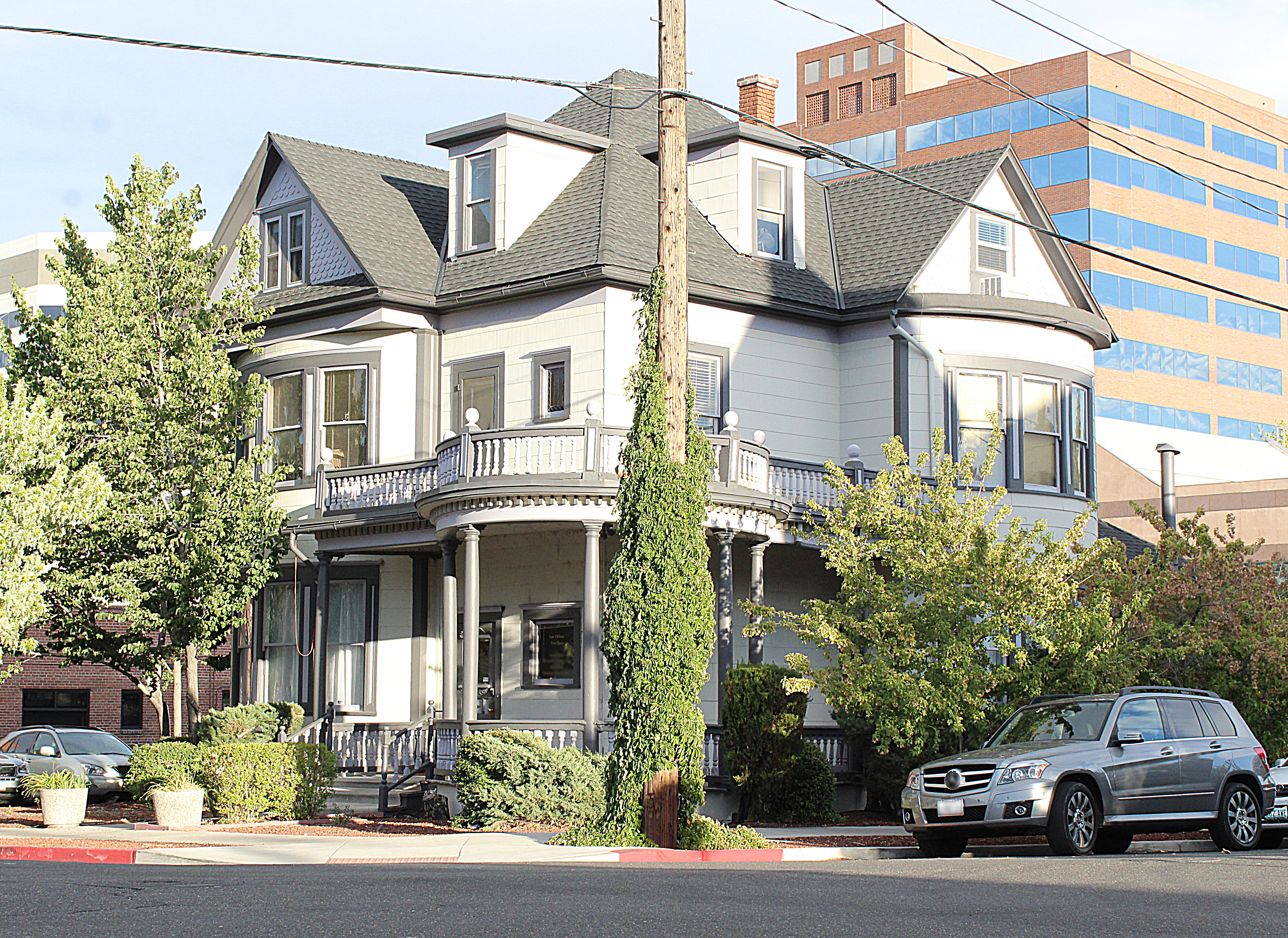

- Location within Nevada Location within the United States
- Location: 150 Ridge St., Reno, Nevada
- Coordinates: 39°31′19″N 119°48′50″W
- Area: 0.2 acres (0.081 ha)
- Built: c.1900-04; 1906
- Architectural style: Queen Anne, Colonial Revival
- NRHP reference No.: 83001121
- Added to NRHP: February 24, 1983

The Nortonia Boarding House, at 150 Ridge St. in Reno, Nevada, was built in c.1900-1904. In 1906 it was purchased by Norton, who changed it to a boarding house, and it was also extended then. It is primarily Queen Anne in style but includes elements of Colonial Revival architecture as well. It was listed on the National Register of Historic Places in 1983. It is notable as "one of the best" surviving Queen Anne houses in Reno.
