= Tarong Homestead =

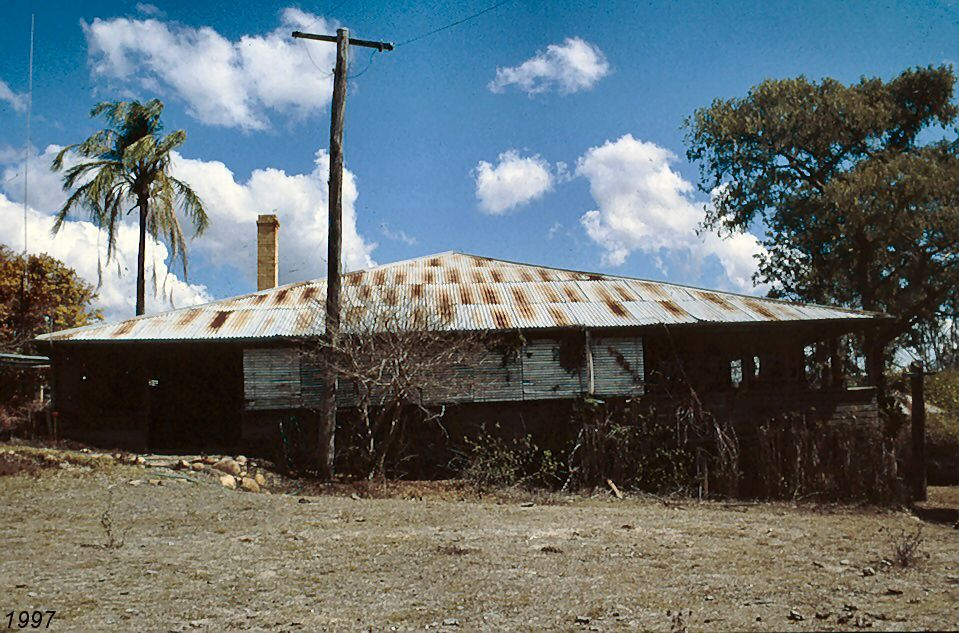
- Tarong Homestead, 1997

- Location within Queensland Location within Australia
- 26.7876°S 151.8514°E
- Location: Cooyar Road, Tarong, South Burnett Region, Queensland, Australia

History
- Design period: 1840s–1860s (mid-19th century)
- Built: 1840s circa – 1890s circa

Queensland Heritage Register
- Official name: Tarong Homestead
- Type: state heritage (landscape, built)
- Designated: 21 October 1992
- Reference no.: 600759
- Significant period: 1840s (historical); 1840s–1890s (fabric) ongoing (social)
- Significant components: out building/s, kitchen/kitchen house, wall/s, terracing, residential accommodation – main house, graveyard, garden/grounds

Tarong Homestead is a heritage-listed homestead at Cooyar Road, Tarong, South Burnett Region, Queensland, Australia. It was built from 1840s to 1890s. It was added to the Queensland Heritage Register on 21 October 1992.

== Early history ==
Tarong Homestead was established in about 1842 with the arrival of James Borthwick to the South Burnett region. Soon after the run was acquired by Borthwick's manager, George Clapperton, who retained the property until his death in 1875 when it was transferred to his estate. Tarong Homestead remains in the ownership of the Clapperton family.

In late 1842, John James Malcolm Borthwick, from Buaraba Homestead near Ipswich, and William Elliott Oliver, visited Taromeo Homestead on their way north seeking land for establishing pastoral runs. After leaving Taromeo, Oliver soon discovered land on which he established Nanango Station and Borthwick continued northward where he decided upon 260 square miles of land that was to become Tarong Station.

Although he is believed to have established Tarong by the end of 1842, Borthwick did not receive official notification in 1850 of the acceptance of his tender for 27,400 acres comprising the Tarong run, two years after the Burnett Pastoral District was established. A depasturing license was issued to Borthwick and Oliver by the New South Wales Government in 1844 (the separation of Queensland not occurring until 1859). Borthwick seems to have spent very little time at Tarong from an early date soon after its establishment, leaving the day-to-day running of the property to his manager George Clapperton.

In 1857 Clapperton acquired the lease of the property and it is through a series of diaries, journals, ledgers and letterbooks kept by him that much of the recorded history of Tarong Station after the mid-1850s is kept. Clapperton was a prominent local citizen, involved with most local activities, including lobbying the government for the laying out of a township at Nanango. During Clapperton's ownership Tarong changed from principally a sheep station, to a sheep-and-cattle station in the 1870s, and under his son's ownership to a cattle station toward the end of the nineteenth century reflecting the region's future prominence in cattle production.

== Construction of the station ==
=== 1840–1880 ===
Although a comprehensive history of the complex of buildings at Tarong Station has not been established, an approximate guide to construction on the station can be discerned from the surviving records. The principal residence was constructed in three stages: the first as the residence of Borthwick, the second as the kitchen wing and the third stage as another general residential wing.

It is thought that the first section of the homestead was constructed in the 1840s. This is the south western wing of the extant complex, and is constructed from vertical adze-cut timber slabs housed in dressed timber beams at the base and top of the walls. This building originally had a gabled roof clad with shingles and extending, with a lower pitch, over verandahs at the front and rear. There is little evidence to suggest an exact building date but it was probably built within a few years of the arrival of Borthwick on the property. The building is similar in construction technique and age to structures on other early homesteads including the first stage of the Canning Downs principal residence (built in about 1847) and also to the first stage of Cressbrook (also built in the mid-1840s).

Substantial building work seems to have been carried out at Tarong in the 1850s, a time when more substantial records exist of life at the station. The woolstore, which no longer stands but was to the south of the residence, was thought to have been completed in the 1850s, as was the kitchen wing. In 1856 reports of the garden suggest that it was "in a poor state of cultivation having been for long used as a sheep yard, occasionally as a green barley park, and again as a maize field." Attempts were made, therefore, to improve the garden. Fences were constructed, and in the next few years a large number of exotic trees and plants were introduced including: orange and lemon trees, walnut trees, chestnut trees, peach, nectarine and apricot trees, bergamot plant, pear trees, plum, sage and cherry plants and fig trees. The diaries give very good records of the work completed in the gardens; walks were laid out and a gardener's cottage constructed in 1874 and garden beds were bordered with brick edging in October 1884.

In 1856 the kitchen wing was constructed perpendicular to the original house using slabs of timber from earlier slab huts and shingling from trees on the property. The construction work was completed by general employees of Tarong. In 1870 a chimney was constructed near the kitchen. It collapsed in 1872 and required replacement; this was done in conjunction with the covering of the shingled roof with iron sheeting.

On 15 December 1875 George Clapperton died, leaving the property to his wife, Anne Clapperton who later remarried, assuming the name of her husband, George Wilson. As a result of Clapperton's death, a small cemetery to the north west of the residence was established to house his grave stone. The cemetery continues to be used as the Clapperton family grave yard.

=== After 1880 ===
Throughout the 1870s and 1880s improvements were made to the residence at Tarong, including papering and painting walls and ceilings and constructing a fireplace in the dining room, which was the largest room of the first building and the room closest to the kitchen. The kitchen was white washed in 1881 and extensively refitted internally in November 1887. In June 1874 a brickmaker was employed full-time at Tarong making brick for use at the property and also for selling locally as closer settlement increased the population in the Nanango area.

The next major phase of building was the construction of the five roomed square planned wing within the cavity of the L-shaped plan created by the kitchen and original residence. The Wilsons, who now owned Tarong, employed a local carpenter, Mr Hugh Davidson, to plan and calculate the quantity of timber for the proposed building in January 1890. Throughout 1890 the building was constructed firstly by Davidson, who was paid out and left in March, and then by another local carpenter, Jimmy Walsh. Assistance was offered to the entire project by a Mr Moppett who worked at Tarong for many years carrying out small carpentering, painting and papering jobs. The new building was planned and timber was both bought from a local timber supplier, Parsons and acquired from the property for shingling. The unusual four panelled timber doors were acquired from a Mr Heimer in Nanango. By November 1890 the carpentering work was complete and Moppett was left with the wall papering and making and laying of carpets. Early in 1891 Moppett constructed and white-washed a chimney, presumably in the new section as he then went about repairing the other chimneys in the residence complex. From April until May 1891 cedar boarded ceilings, skirtings and other mouldings were erected in the residence. In December of that year Moppett constructed wardrobes and lined and papered the original dining room in the first wing of the house.

At some time in the early twentieth century the verandahs of the 1890 section of the Tarong residence were extended, also necessitating the replacement of the shingled roof with a low pitched corrugated iron clad hipped roof. Many smaller buildings on the site were constructed including the meat room which was converted from an old store in June 1862, a bath house built on the lagoon in 1880, and other removals and reuse of timber among the smaller buildings.

The original lease holding of Tarong was reduced with the government encouraging closer settlement in the South Burnett region. This happened over many years from the 1870s, to consolidation in the mid-1880s and to the early twentieth century when two Land Acts (1897 and 1902) allowed the resumption of much of the lease. The resumption in June 1910 generated a long-running court case over the level of compensation. The government offered £1,745 while Clapperton claimed £41,174. Eventually the Land Court determined a compensation of £9,654.

== Description ==
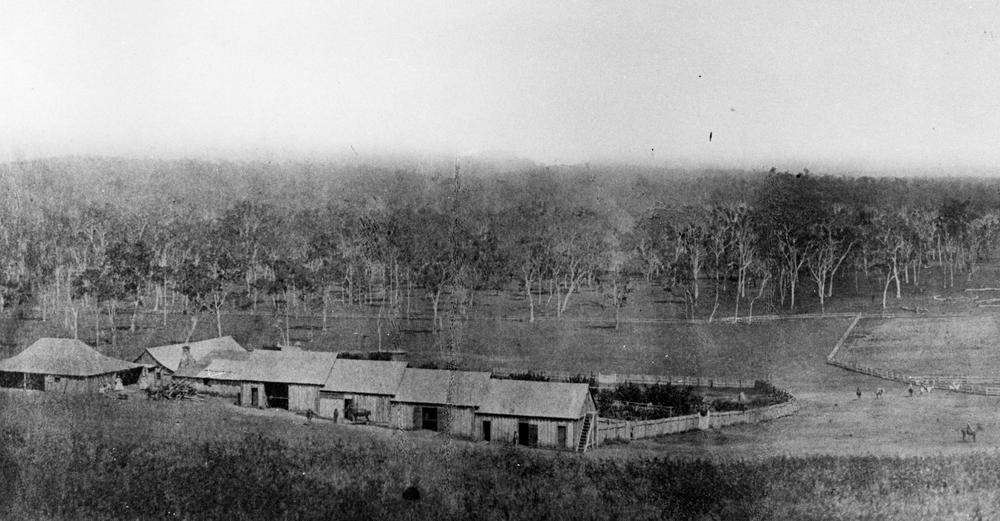
Historic photo of Tarong Station

Tarong Homestead comprises 630 acres of land, bordered to the north by Cooyar Creek. The principal residence is situated on elevated land, overlooking flats to the south-west and north-west.

The principal residence at Tarong comprises three timber buildings of varying ages, separate in structure but joined by verandahs, an internal garden courtyard, and a semi-open breezeway. The first section, constructed in the 1840s, is a long, one-room-wide, section running south-east to north-west; the kitchen constructed in 1859, runs perpendicular to the first wing and is joined to it at the south-eastern end by a verandah. In the cavity of the L-shaped plan created by the two first buildings is a square planned building surrounded by verandahs built in 1890. The three sections manifest different timber construction methods. Access to the residence at Tarong is via the verandah of either the earliest section or through the wider verandahs of the 1890s buildings.

The earliest section of the building is constructed from adze cut, unpainted vertical timber slabs housed in painted timber bearers at the base and top of the walls. The building has a corrugated iron clad gabled roof, steeply pitched over the rooms and changing to a more gradual pitch over the front and rear verandah. At the south eastern end of this section, projecting from the original dining room which was at this end, is another fireplace formed from bricks clad with corrugated iron sheeting projecting from the end of the building. Adjoining the dining room on the north eastern side is a skillion roofed and timber framed extension clad with horizontal chamfered boards. Most of this section of the residence is elevated only very slightly from the ground level, although a gentle tapering downwards to the north west necessitates open tread timber steps providing access to the south western verandah.

This wing houses three principal rooms, with additional rooms of modern fitout added to the two ends. The rooms have access both to the front, south western verandah and to the rear verandah via both pairs of French doors and timber four panelled doors. The north eastern wall of this section of the residence is clad with fibrous cement sheeting. Internally this building has raked timber beaded board ceilings, timber boarded floors and timber boarded walls. Later V-J pine boarding lines the internal walls up to the level of the start of the ceiling rake in the two smaller rooms. The larger room, originally the dining room has a dark green hessian backed wall paper and a patterned frieze featuring a stylised landscape design. A small timber lined room, on the original south western verandah is entered from the former dining room. At the north western end of this part of the residence is a small two roomed extension, fitted as a bathroom with small gauge corrugated iron clad walls and fibrous cement internal lining.

The kitchen wing, the smallest of the three sections of the residence, comprises only two principal rooms and is of similar vertical slab construction, but the vertical slabs in some places are rounded and chamfered at the top and base. The building has a corrugated iron hipped roof, again steeply pitched over the main rooms and more gradual over the front and rear verandahs. An iron ventilator with decorative cap projects through the ridge of the roof. Attached to the south western end of the kitchen is a substantial brick chimney which services the main kitchen oven and a bread oven in that end of the building. The north eastern end of the kitchen wing supports a large climbing plant which, though picturesque, threatens to overtake the building. Internally the kitchen wing has a raked ceiling clad with unpainted cedar beaded boards, a timber boarded floor and an early white lime paint on all internal walls. The door to the kitchen from the north western verandah comprises three adze cut timber slabs, braced on the rear side. Early internal fittings in the kitchen include small cupboards, a long preparation bench, the stove and associated bread stove; and shelving. At the north eastern end of the kitchen block is a small storage room, with raked ceiling, unpainted timber lining boards and a boarded floor.

The 1890 section of the homestead, elevated on round timber posts, comprises five rooms of varying sizes all opening onto a wide verandah which surrounds the section. This section has a low pitched hipped roof clad with corrugated iron sheets, extending over the verandahs where it is lined with fibrous cement lining sheets with timber cover strips concealing edges. The verandah is supported on slender square planned posts which have partially chamfered corners and sit on the hand rail of the chamfer board cladded balustrade. Infilling some of the verandah openings are a series of early timber louvres. The building is constructed from wide, horizontal hardwood slabs housed in dressed vertical studs. Doors and windows in this section are housed frames between the studs. The windows are vertical sash with two sheets of glass per pane. The doors in this section of the building are four panelled with bolection mouldings on the horizontal edges of the panels and chamfered vertical edges. Above most of the doors but separated by two sections of timber slab, are operable transom windows, aligned with the ceiling line.

A fireplace is found in the eastern corner of this section, formed by white washed bricks which project from one of the principal rooms onto the verandah space and taper towards the ceiling. A slender chimney, of unpainted cream bricks, projects from the roof and is crowned with a simple corbelled top. Adjacent to the south west side of the base of the chimney, on the verandah, is a timber V-J boarded phone box.

Internally this section of Tarong, which comprises five rooms, has cedar beaded board ceilings and timber boarded floors and V-J boarded walls lined with paper. The wall paper is backed with a hessian based lining in most of the rooms and is complete with a frieze paper, complementing the general wall paper. The paper in each room is different but four of the papers are of the same type vertical pattern and water-wave embossing on a satin base. Also in these rooms are sections of early linoleum and oil cloth floor coverings. One of the rooms features another paper, without lining, of an orange and yellow background and printed white large floral design and green and yellow patterned frieze. Early furniture and fittings, including wardrobes, drawers, shelving units, chimney mantle and fireplace survive in this part of the residence.

To the south east of the residence are a number of timber outbuildings, of various ages and construction types. Furthest to the south of this group of buildings is a hipped roof building clad with horizontal weatherboards and with a skillioned extension to the south, thought to be an early fowl house. One of the more substantial outbuildings is a timber framed and gable roofed structure, partially of vertical slab construction and most recently in use as a garage but formerly a residence, with two shallow hipped roofed extensions on either end. There are several other gabled roofed structures clad with horizontal weatherboards and in varying states of deterioration. From this section and continuing eastward are a number of aligned round timber posts which are remnant from an early woodshed. To the north west of the residence are two more outbuildings, both with hipped roofs clad with corrugated iron one of masonry and timber construction and the other timber framed and cladded.

To the north, north west and north east of the house are remnants of a large garden. Stone terracing and walling and extensive timber paling fences survive as do many established trees and plantings. The trees in this area include a jacaranda, several figs, pepperina, and orange trees. To the north west of this area is a small graveyard containing seven gravestones, mostly of the Clapperton family, dating from 1876 to about 1980. The graveyard is bordered with a course and recent single rail timber log fence without a gate. Extending eastward from the graveyard are a number of established olive trees planted in a line. Further to the north west are timber posts and remnants of an early woolstore and complex built on this site.

To the south west of the house at the base of the spur is a substantial lagoon, on the banks of which are timber posts, remnants from an early bath house and water slide. As well many trees and early plantings surround the lagoon.

About 200 metres (660 ft) distant from the house to the north west is a power line supported on large three tiered metal power poles.

== Heritage listing ==
Tarong Homestead was listed on the Queensland Heritage Register on 21 October 1992 having satisfied the following criteria.

The place is important in demonstrating the evolution or pattern of Queensland's history.

Tarong Homestead was established by John James Malcolm Borthwick in about 1842, one of the first runs taken in the Wide Bay/Burnett area. The run demonstrates the development of Queensland, particularly this area from the establishment of pastoral holdings in the 1840s to closer settlement from the 1870s. The property illustrates the development of pastoral practices in Queensland, particularly the development of the beef industry in the South Burnett Region.

The place demonstrates rare, uncommon or endangered aspects of Queensland's cultural heritage.

Tarong has many rare built elements including an 1840s slab hut; an 1859 slab kitchen and surviving wallpaper in six rooms probably dating from the late nineteenth century. The site remains remarkably intact, despite continual additions.

The place has potential to yield information that will contribute to an understanding of Queensland's history.

The early date of Tarong with its many extant features and extensive early documentation suggest that a potential exists for further historical and archaeological research which may yield information which will contribute to an understanding of early Queensland station life.

The place is important in demonstrating the principal characteristics of a particular class of cultural places.

The place is important in demonstrating the principal characteristics of an early Queensland pastoral station. The arrangement of the early buildings and their relationship to outbuildings provides important evidence of early station life. The buildings comprising the residence demonstrate three nineteenth century methods of timber construction; with two forms of vertical slab construction and a later horizontal slab building.

The place is important because of its aesthetic significance.

Tarong has aesthetic significance; the entire site has a picturesque quality resulting from the layering of various periods of building construction over many years and the siting of these buildings overlooking the surrounding flats. The residence has architectural significance for its composition and planning, producing an environmentally sensitive and comfortable building.

The place has a strong or special association with a particular community or cultural group for social, cultural or spiritual reasons.

Tarong has special associations with the South Burnett community as one of their first settled stations and a place of employment for local residents and their families many of whom remain in the area.

The place has a special association with the life or work of a particular person, group or organisation of importance in Queensland's history.

The place is associated with the Clapperton family who have owned Tarong since 1857 and were instrumental in the development of the South Burnett region and the town of Nanango.
