= Tarong Energy =

Australian electricity generation company

- Company type: Public
- Industry: Energy
- Headquarters: Brisbane, Australia
- Area served: Queensland
- Products: Electricity
- Number of employees: 570
- Parent: Stanwell Corporation

Tarong Energy was an electricity generation company in Australia. It was fully owned by the Queensland Government, and had a portfolio of generating sites using thermal coal and hydroelectric power in Queensland. Following a review by the Treasurer of Queensland of the state's electricity sector in 2010, the assets of Tarong Energy were split between Stanwell Corporation and CS Energy on 1 July 2011. Tarong Energy as an entity became a subsidiary of Stanwell Corporation. The restructure was made to save costs.

The company supplied roughly one quarter of Queensland's electricity supply. Energy was sourced from Tarong Power Station, Tarong North Power Station and Wivenhoe Power Station in Queensland.

Tarong Power Station is the major employer in the South Burnett region. The company has been working on post-combustion emission capture technologies in an effort to reduce the impacts of climate change.

== See also ==
- National Electricity Market
