= Meandu Mine =

Coal mine in Queensland, Australia

- Location within Queensland
- Location: Queensland, Australia; 26°49′S 151°54′E
- Products: Thermal coal
- Company: Stanwell Corporation
- Acquired: 2011

Meandu Mine is a coal mine west of Yarraman in Neumgna, Queensland, Australia. The open-cut mine supplies coal to Tarong Power Station and Tarong North Power Station. It is owned by Stanwell Corporation and operated by Downer Mining.

Work first started on the mine in 1978. The mine has five active working pits. It can supply a maximum of seven million tonnes of coal per year. The mine has enough reserves to continue mining until at least 2037.

Owners wanted to replace the existing Meandu mine supply of coal to Tarong with another mine near Kingaroy.

Operators of the mine want to continue extracting coal for decades to come.

Progressive‌ ‌rehabilitation‌ ‌of‌ the Meandu‌ ‌Mine‌ has been implemented from the start.

== History ==
Initially the mine started with enough reserves to supply coal for 25 years. Ownership of the mine was transferred‌ ‌to‌ ‌Stanwell‌ ‌in‌ ‌July‌ ‌2011.‌ ‌

Thiess controlled mining operations at the mine between October 2007 and December 2012. From 2013 mining operations have been conducted by Downer. In 2021, operations were to be taken over by an Indonesian company, PT Bukit Makmur Mandiri Utama or BUMA.

== See also ==
- Coal mining in Australia
- List of coal mines in Queensland
