= Luke Bone Grocery-Boarding House =

- U.S. National Register of Historic Places
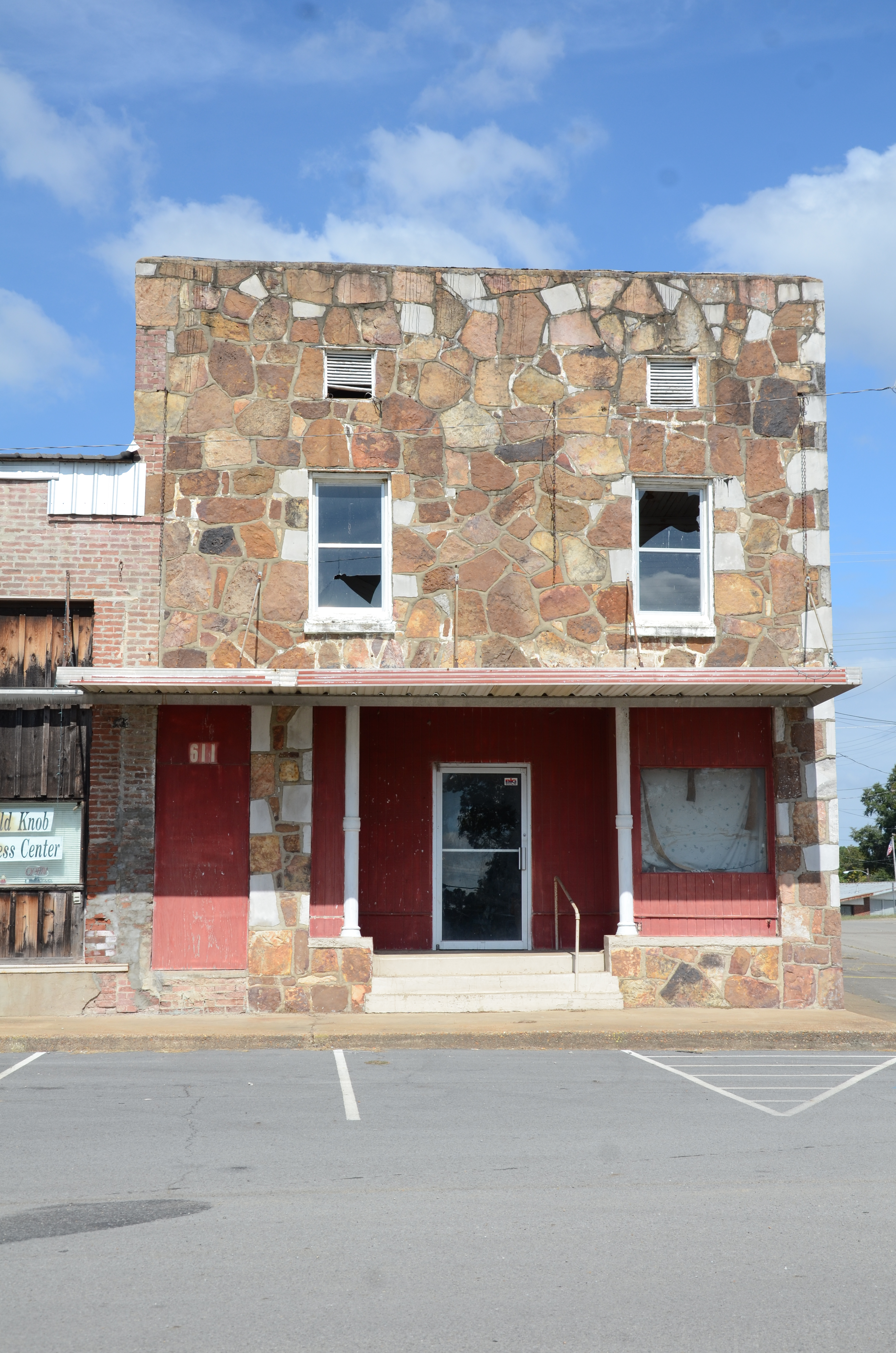

- Location within Arkansas Location within the United States
- Location: Jct. of Main and Market Sts., Bald Knob, Arkansas
- Coordinates: 35°18′35″N 91°34′0″W
- Area: less than one acre
- Architectural style: Vernacular rectangular indus
- MPS: White County MPS
- NRHP reference No.: 91001275
- Added to NRHP: September 13, 1991

The Luke Bone Grocery-Boarding House is a historic mixed-use commercial and residential building at Main and Market Streets in Bald Knob, Arkansas. It is a two-story structure, faced in cut stone but structurally built out of brick. It has a single storefront, sheltered by an open porch, with a pair of sash windows above. When built c. 1915, it housed a shop and restaurant below, and a hotel above, serving railroad passengers. The hotel was later converted to a boarding house, and the cut stone exterior was added in the 1930s, when the style was popularized by projects of the Works Progress Administration.

The house was listed on the National Register of Historic Places in 1991.

== See also ==
- National Register of Historic Places listings in White County, Arkansas
