= Tarong North Power Station =

Coal fired power station in Queensland, Australia

- Country: Australia
- Location: Queensland
- Coordinates: 26°46′33.98″S 151°54′52.18″E
- Status: Operational
- Commission date: 2003
- Owner: Stanwell Corporation

Thermal power station
- Primary fuel: Coal
- Cooling source: Fresh

Power generation
- Units operational: 1
- Nameplate capacity: 443 MW

Tarong North Power Station is a 443-megawatt coal-fired power station on the same site as Tarong Power Station in the South Burnett. The Queensland Government commissioned the construction of the power station in November 1999. Construction work began in 2000. The power station was initially owned by a 50/50 joint venture between Tarong Energy and TM Energy. Full ownership of the power station by Tarong Energy was obtained in November 2009.

The plant was opened in 2003 and is based on an energy-efficient supercritical design. The Steam Generator was supplied by IHI and the steam turbine was manufactured by Toshiba. Particulate emissions at the power station are reduced by bag filter technology.

It is expected to close in 2036 or 2037 as part of Australia's coal phase out.

Boondooma Dam was purpose-built to provide water to both Tarong and Tarong North power stations. Coal is supplied from the nearby Meandu Mine.

== See also ==
- List of active power stations in Queensland
