= Tarong Power Station =

Coal-fired power station in Australia

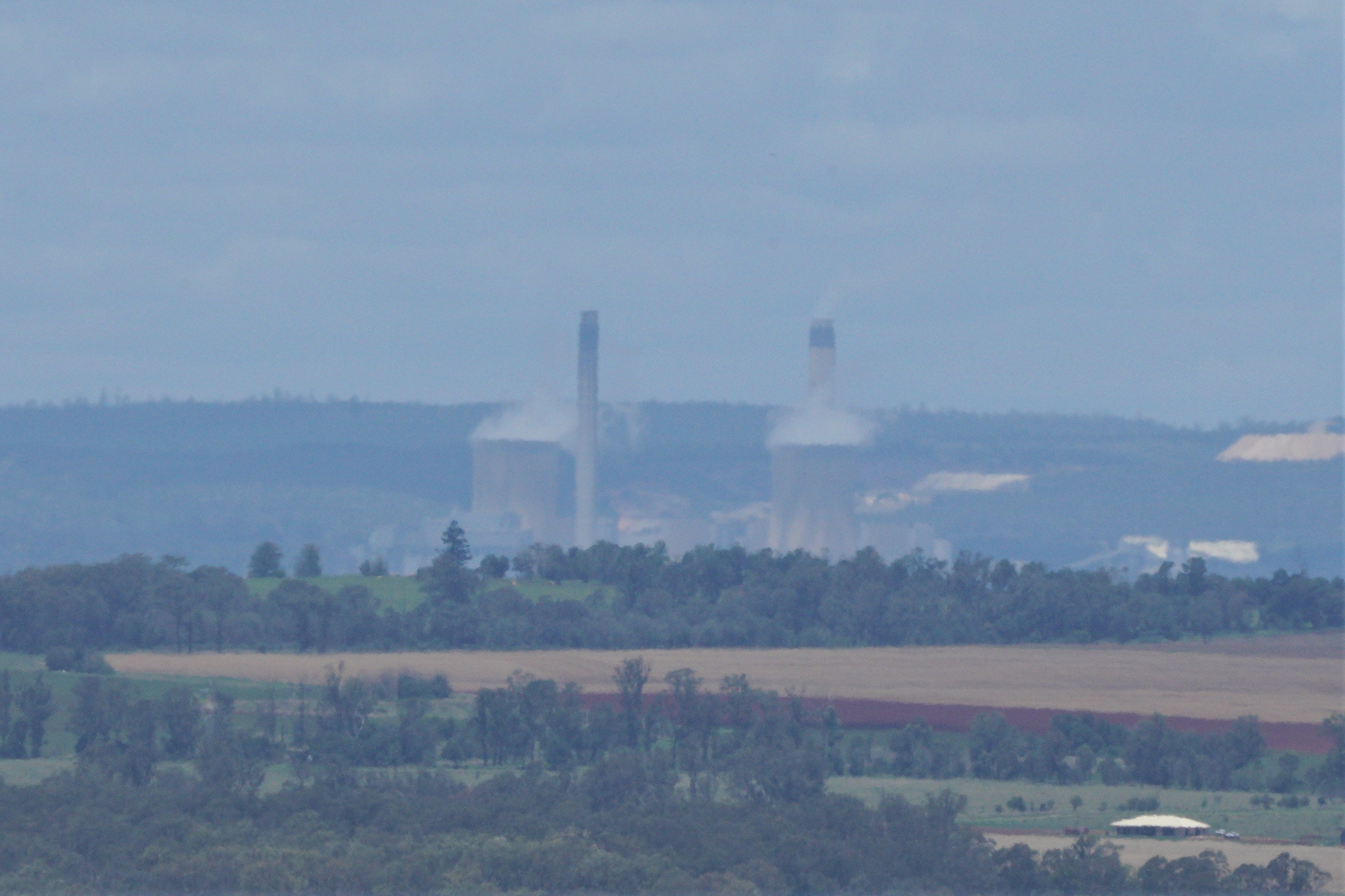
- Tarong Power Station in 2021
- Location of the Tarong Power Station in Queensland, Australia
- Country: Australia
- Location: Tarong, Queensland
- Coordinates: 26°46′52″S 151°54′54″E
- Status: Operational
- Construction began: 1979
- Commission date: 1 Unit: May 1984; 2 Unit: May 1985; 3 Unit: February 1986; 4 Unit: November 1986
- Construction cost: A$1.23 billion
- Owner: Stanwell Corporation

Thermal power station
- Primary fuel: Bituminous coal

Power generation
- Units operational: 4 × 350 MW
- Make and model: Hitachi
- Nameplate capacity: 1,400 MW

External links
- Website: https://www.stanwell.com/energy-assets/
- Commons: Related media on Commons

The Tarong Power Station is a coal fired power station located on a 1,500 hectares (3,700 acres) site in Tarong in the South Burnett Region near the town of Nanango, in Queensland, Australia. Stanwell Corporation operates the plant. The station has a maximum generating capacity of 1,400 megawatts, generated from four turbines. Coal is supplied via a conveyor from Meandu Mine, which is 1.5 kilometres (0.93 mi) away and is also owned by Stanwell. Water is supplied from Boondooma Dam.

== Construction and design ==
The location near Nanango was the preference of Premier Joh Bjelke-Petersen, out of a total of three possible locations that were considered.

It was decided to build a new power station at Tarong in 1978, with work beginning in the following year.

Stanwell decided in 2021 to install a 150 MW grid battery at Tarong. Scheduled for 2023, the battery will add approximately two hours of storage to the facility. However, the battery was doubled to 300 MW and 600 MWh, connected in 2025 and operating in February 2026.

== Emissions ==
The power station was the site for a pilot project which had been expected to reduce emissions by 1000 tonnes per year by collected carbon dioxide from flue gases. The project was developed by CSIRO and launched in 2010.

A second trial to capture greenhouse gas emissions was conducted by MBD Energy. The technology being trialled collected carbon dioxide and pumped it into waste water where it synthesised oil-rich algae into edible seaweed products or oils. Research measured performance of certain bacteria types.

== Demand reduction ==
In October 2012, Stanwell announced plans to shut down two generating units for two years. The electricity market was oversupplied and wholesale electricity prices were relatively low. The scaling down of operations resulted in the loss of employment for some workers.

== Return to service ==
Because of higher natural gas prices, in 2014 power generators again turned to coal-fired plants. However, in January 2014, Stanwell disclosed that maintenance inspections had revealed cracks in the rotors of the steam turbines in Units 1, 3 and 4. The cracks in the still-operational Units 1 and 3 caused the company to replace their rotors. At the time, the company was considering whether to pursue a repair or replacement for Unit 4's 50-tonne (110000 lb) turbine rotor.

In July 2014, one of two units shut down in 2012 returned to service. The recommissioning task involved a weld repair, and was a first for a turbine of that type, taking 20,000 hours to complete. The second turbine was expected to return to operation by mid-2015.

== See also ==
- Fossil fuel power plant
- Stanwell Power Station
