= Yarraman, Queensland =

Yarraman
- Town
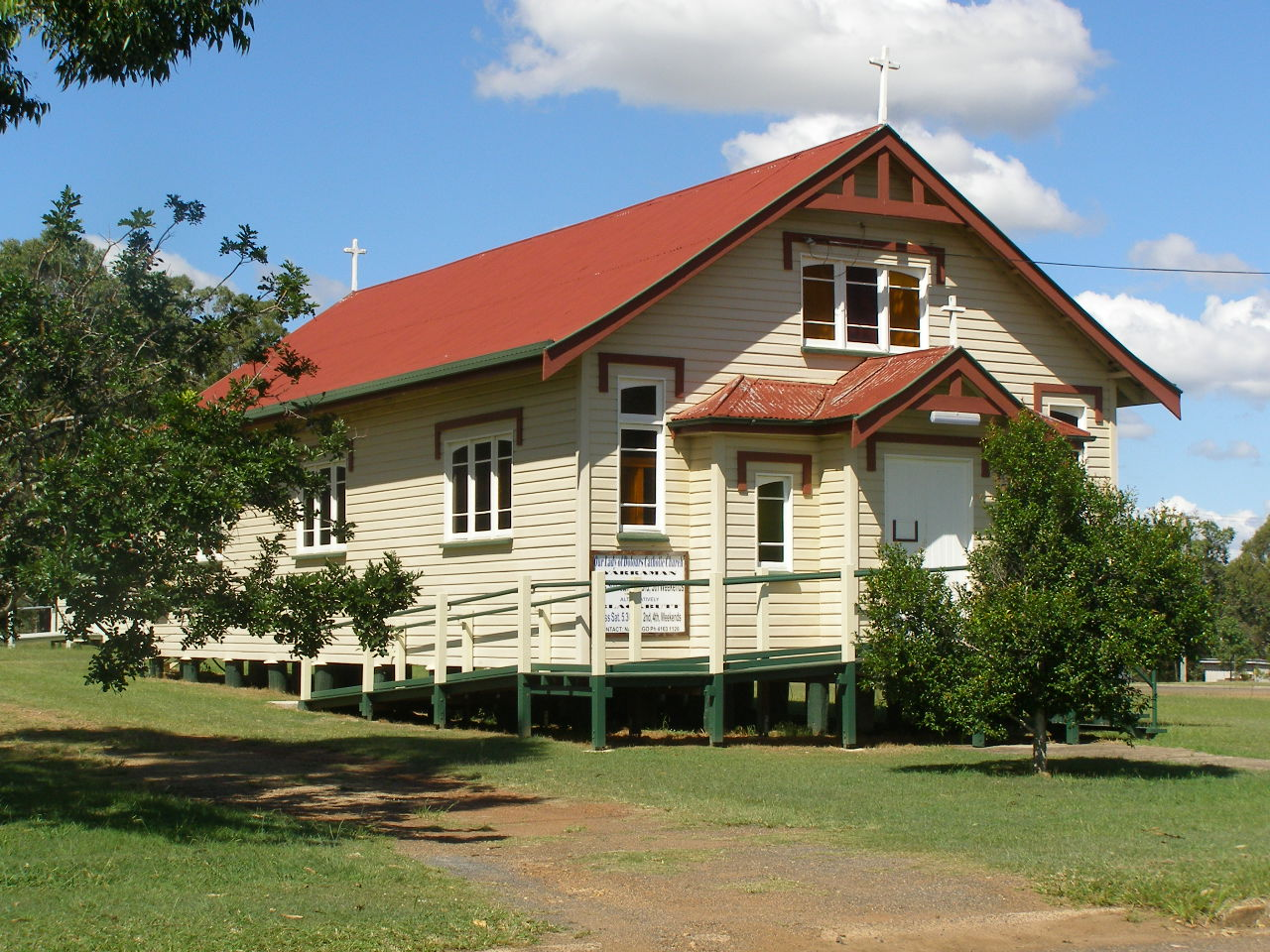
- Our Lady of Dolours Roman Catholic church in Yarraman

- Interactive map of Yarraman
- Coordinates: 26.8411°S 151.9841°E
- Country: Australia
- State: Queensland
- LGA: Toowoomba Region
- Location: 20.9 km (13.0 mi) S of Nanango; 44.6 km (27.7 mi) SSE of Kingaroy; 117 km (73 mi) N of Toowoomba; 170 km (110 mi) NW of Brisbane

Government
  - State electorate: Nanango
  - Federal division: Maranoa

Area
  - Total: 128.6 km^{2} (49.7 sq mi)
- Elevation: 407 m (1,335 ft)

Population
  - Total: 1,127 (2021 census)
  - Density: 8.764/km^{2} (22.698/sq mi)
- Time zone: UTC+10:00 (AEST)
- Postcode: 4614
- County: Cavendish
- Parish: Cooyar
Localities around Yarraman
| South Nanango | South East Nanango | Teelah |
| Tarong; Neumgna | Yarraman | Taromeo |
| Upper Yarraman | Gilla | Nukku |

Yarraman is a rural town and locality in the Toowoomba Region, Queensland, Australia. In the 2021 census, the locality of Yarraman had a population of 1,127.

== Geography ==
Yarraman is located 181 kilometres (112 mi) northwest of the state capital, Brisbane on the junction of the New England and D'Aguilar highways.

Yarraman is set in a fertile valley and produces timber, grain and beef and dairy goods, which it exports to larger cities.

Yarraman is surrounded by the various components of the fragmentary Bunya Mountains and Yarraman Important Bird Area which contains the largest remaining population of the vulnerable black-breasted button-quail.

In the far west the Meandu Mine extracts coal for the nearby power station.

== History ==
The name Yarraman means horse in the Port Jackson Pidgin English spread by Aboriginal stockmen in eastern Australia. It might derive from word yira or yera meaning large teeth.

The creek at Yarraman was used in the 1870s as a place for local graziers and stockmen to meet and trade cattle. The township was established in the late 1870s.

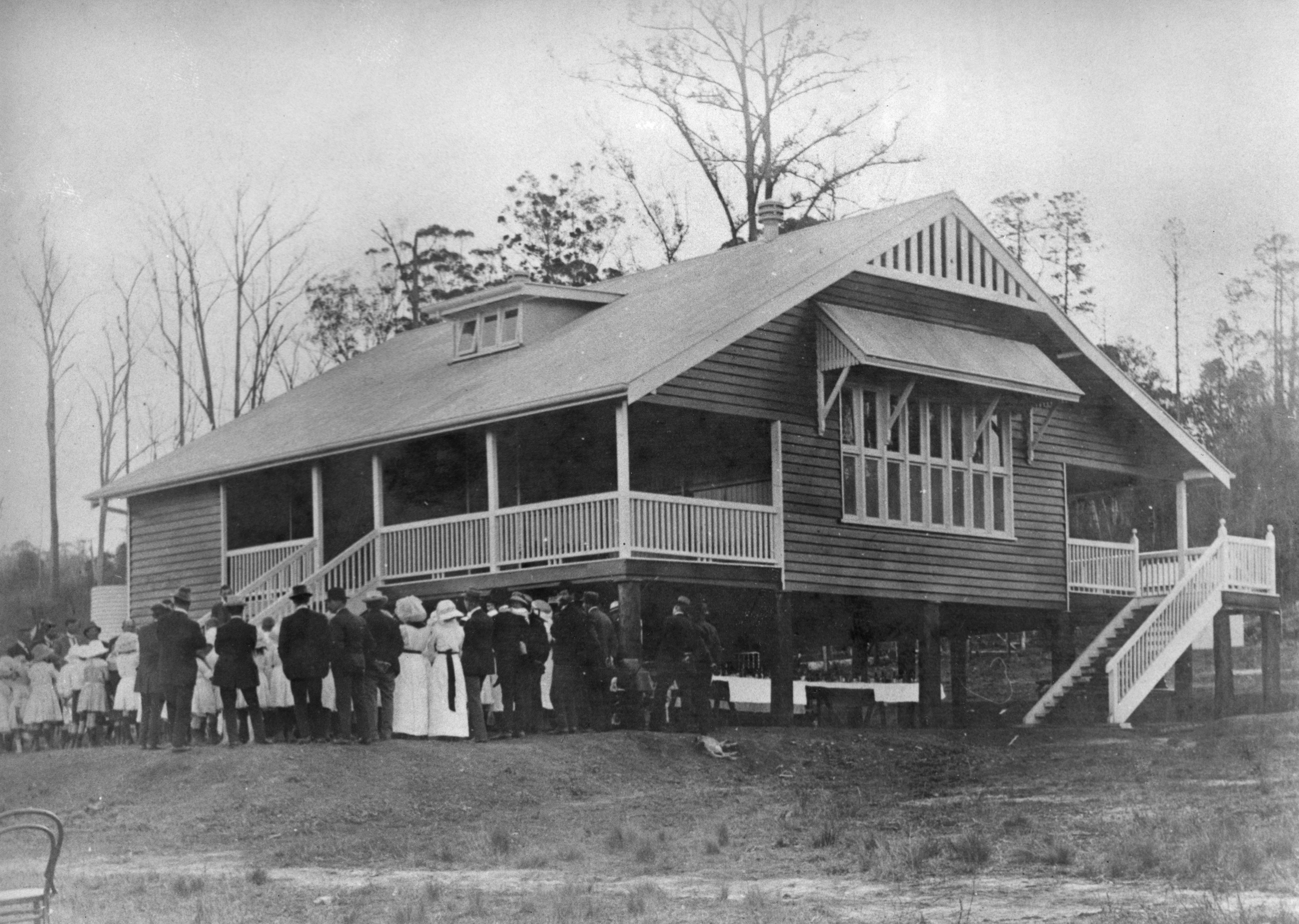
Crowd in front of Yarraman State School, circa 1913

Yarraman Creek Provisional School opened on 17 July 1901 with 10 students, some miles east of the current school site. On 1 January 1909, it became Yarraman Creek State School. On 31 August 1914, a new school site was established with a new school building. In 1935, it was renamed Yarraman State School. In 1963, the school expanded to include a secondary department with an initial enrolment of 47 students. In 1980, a pre-school was added.

As there were many large hoop pine forests in the area, a timber mill was established in 1910.

The town was connected to Brisbane and Ipswich by the Brisbane Valley Railway Line in 1913. The Brisbane Valley Railway Line was closed in 1988.

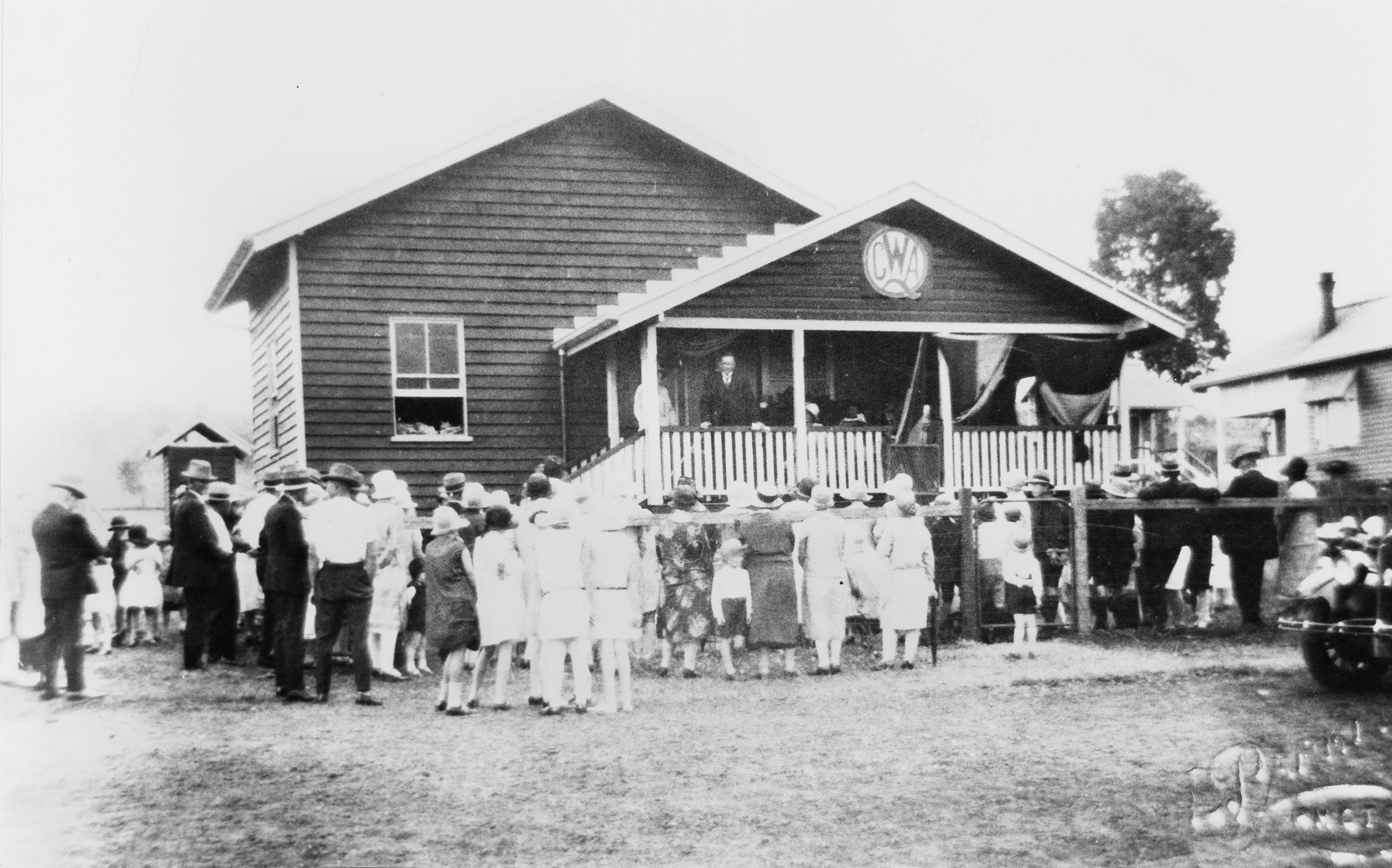
Opening of the Country Women's Association Hall, Yarraman, 1928

The Queensland Country Women's Association established a branch at Yarraman in 1923. After raising funds a new QCWA Hall was opened in 1928. After both Blackbutt and Yarraman branches had been closed for a number of years, the Blackbutt and Yarraman QCWA branch was formed after their first meeting in 2014. The Yarraman QCWA building had already been removed and sold.

Rocky Hill Provisional School opened on 30 October 1924. A new school building was erected and in October 1929 it became Rocky Hill State School. It closed in 1963. The building was relocated to Yarraman in the 1960s and has been used for various community purposes. In 2016 it was relocated to the Yarraman Heritage House where it will be restored as classrooms with school displays.

During World War II, Yarraman was the location of RAAF No.21 Inland Aircraft Fuel Depot (IAFD), completed in 1942 and closed on 29 August 1944. Usually consisting of 4 tanks, 31 fuel depots were built across Australia for the storage and supply of aircraft fuel for the RAAF and the US Army Air Forces at a total cost of £900,000 ($1,800,000).

The Sacred Heart Convent was completed in 1945. The Sisters of Mercy opened a boarding school for boys in 1946. It closed in 1966. The building is now used as the Yarraman Heritage House.

The Yarraman Library opened in 1982 and had a major refurbishment in 2016. it is now operated by the Toowoomba Regional Council.

Between 2002 and 2018, the former Brisbane Valley railway line was redeveloped as the Brisbane Valley Rail Trail, the longest rail trail in Australia at 161 kilometres (100 mi).

== Demographics ==
Based on data gathered through the census, Yarraman's population has changed as shown below.

| Year | Number of people | Census data link |
|---|---|---|
| 2001 census | 897 | |
| 2006 census | 945 | |
| 2011 census | 1,230 | |
| 2016 census | 1,064 | |
| 2021 census | 1,127 | |

== Education ==
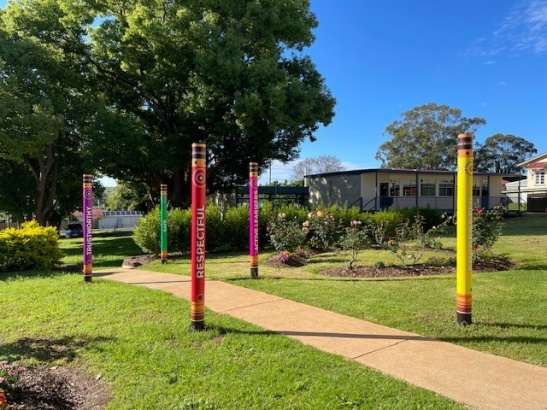
Yarraman State School, 2024

Yarraman State School is a government primary and secondary (Prep–9) school for boys and girls at 17 John Street (26.8415°S 151.9767°E). In 2017, the school had an enrolment of 163 students with 15 teachers (13 full-time equivalent) and 19 non-teaching staff (11 full-time equivalent). In 2022, the school had an enrolment of 187 students.

The nearest government secondary school providing Years 10 to 12 education is Nanango State High School in Nanango to the north.

== Amenities ==
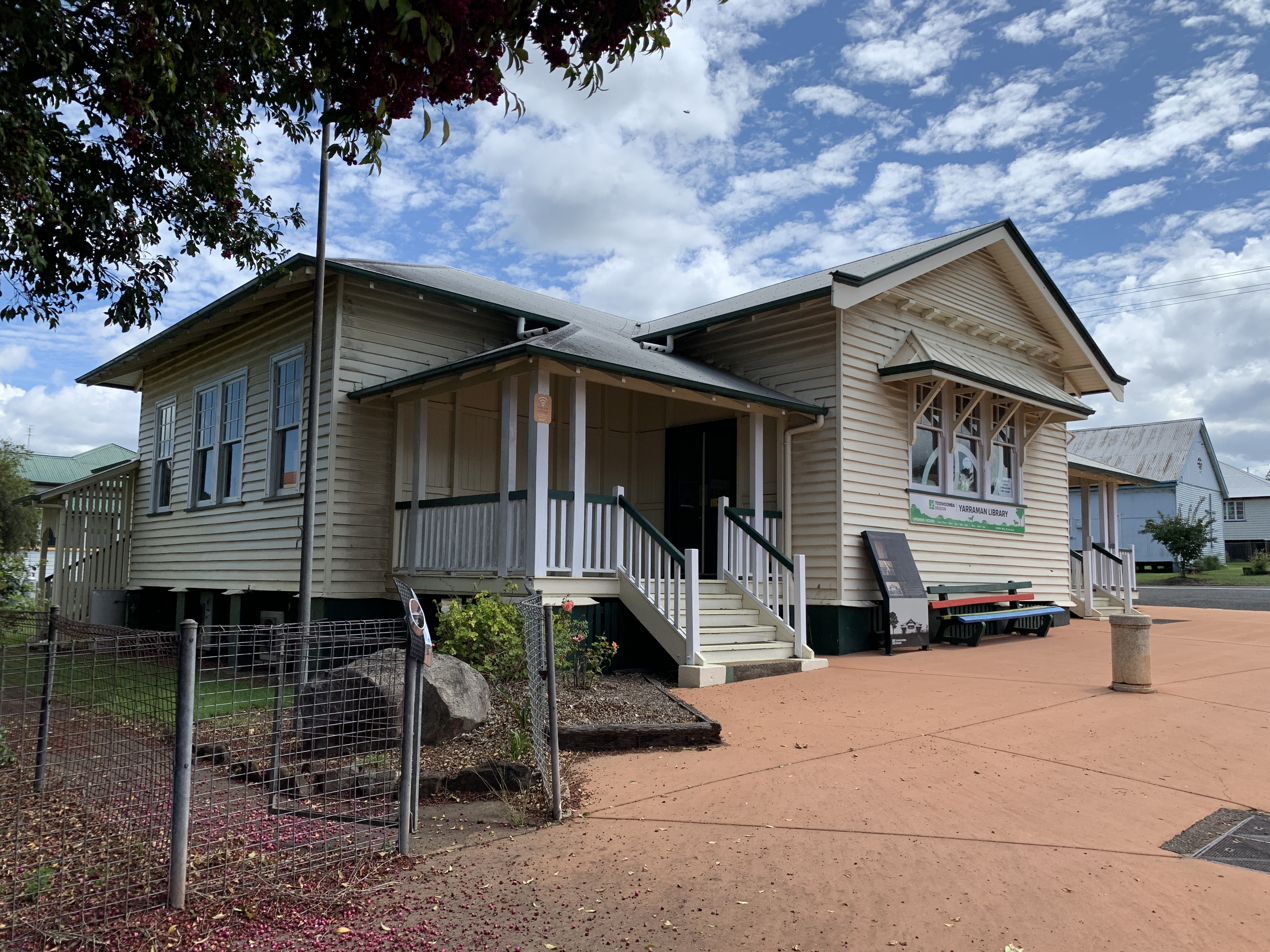
Yarraman Library (and former Post Office), 2023

The Yarraman Library and Post Office are located on the corner of Toomey and Douglas Streets, and offer access to wireless internet. The Toowoomba Regional Council refurbished the library in 2016 including new furnishings, paint, and an accessible parking space and toilet.

The Yarraman Memorial Pool is located in Margaret Street, on the New England Highway.

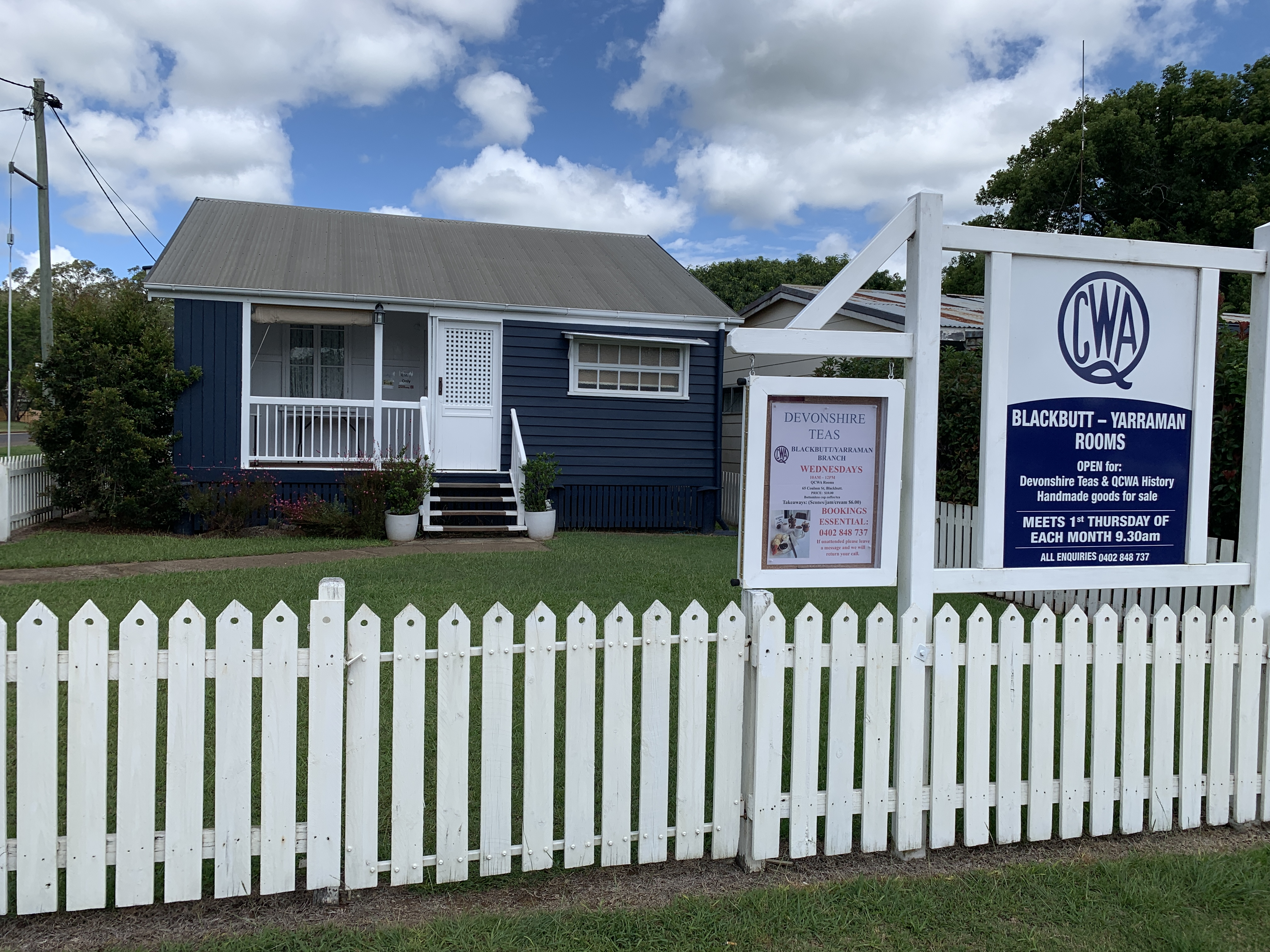
Blackbutt-Yarraman Queensland Country Women's Association Hall, 2023

The Blackbutt Yarraman branch of the Queensland Country Women's Association meets at the QCWA Hall at 65 Coulson Street in Blackbutt.

Yarraman has a not-for-profit community radio station Wild Horse FM 99.7 which began broadcasting in 2002. The station is housed in the Historic Yarraman Heritage House.

Yarraman has three churches: St Philip's Anglican Church, Our Lady of Dolours Catholic Church, and Calvary Lutheran church.

== Attractions ==
Yarraman is the northernmost destination of the Brisbane Valley Rail Trail for walking, cycling and horse riding. The trail commences at Yarraman Station Park in McNeil Street (26.83870°S 151.99094°E).
