= Butter Factory =

Butter Factory may refer to:

== Australia ==
=== New South Wales ===
- Kiama Pioneer Butter Factory, former butter factory

=== Queensland, Australia ===
- Boonah Butter Factory, heritage-listed former butter factory
- Kingaroy Butter Factory, heritage-listed former butter factory
- Kingston Butter Factory, former butter factory
- Nanango Butter Factory Building, heritage-listed butter factory

=== South Australia ===
- Milang Butter Factory, in Milang, heritage-listed former butter factory
