= South Burnett Co-operative Dairy Association Factory =

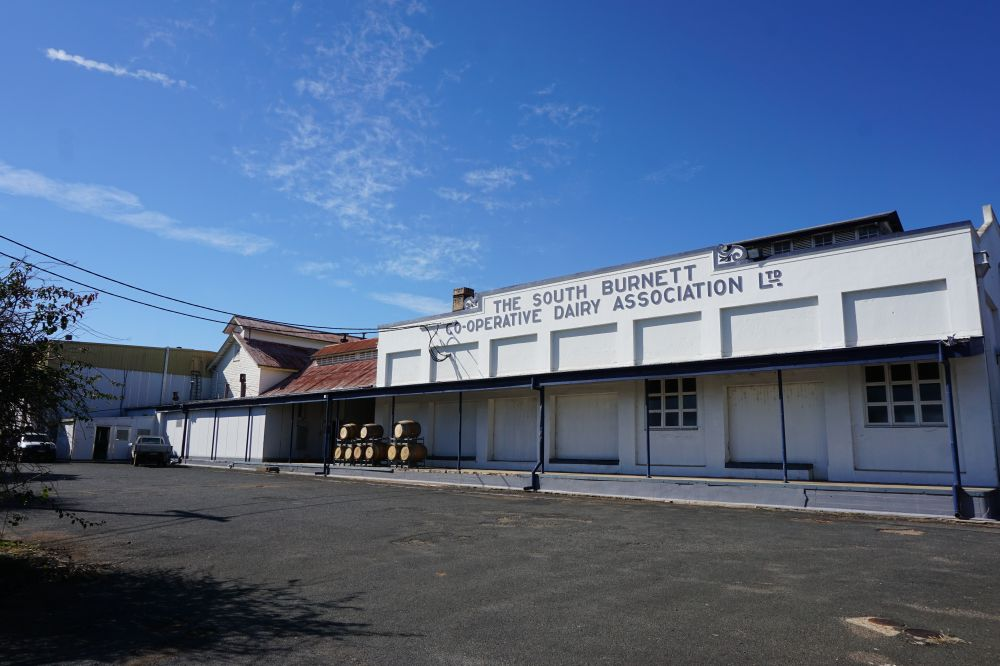
- South Burnett Co-operative Dairy Association Factory, 2019

- Location within Queensland Location within Australia
- 26.2483°S 151.9377°E
- Location: Macalister Street, Murgon, South Burnett Region, Queensland, Australia

History
- Design period: 1919–1930s (interwar period)
- Built: 1929

Site notes
- Architect: George Gerald Hutton

Queensland Heritage Register
- Official name: South Burnett Co-operative Dairy Association Factory (former)
- Type: state heritage (built)
- Designated: 9 November 2012
- Reference no.: 602811
- Significant period: (20th century) 1913–1990s
- Significant components: factory building, engine/generator shed/room / power supply
- Builders: H Taylor

South Burnett Co-operative Dairy Association Factory is a heritage-listed former factory at Macalister Street, Murgon, South Burnett Region, Queensland, Australia. It was designed by George Gerald Hutton and built in 1929 by H Taylor. It was added to the Queensland Heritage Register on 9 November 2012.

== History ==
The former South Burnett Co-operative Dairy Association Ltd Factory Murgon, incorporating a range of structures dating from 1908 onwards, was built for South Burnett Co-operative Dairy Association, and is an important site associated with the manufacture of dairy products in the region from 1913 to 1995.

From the late 1800s, a number of critical factors enabled the expansion of the dairy industry into one of Queensland's principal primary industries by the interwar period. These included: government resumption and repurchase of land from pastoralists for the purpose of agricultural selection; the introduction of mechanical cream separators in the 1880s; Babcock testing to accurately measure cream content in milk; The Meat and Dairy Encouragement Act 1893 which made provision for government loans to construct butter and cheese factories; and the Queensland Department of Agriculture and Stock's use of a "Travelling Dairy" to demonstrate techniques and equipment to potential dairy farmers throughout Queensland. This period also saw the introduction of sown pastures such as paspalum and Rhodes grass and the cultivation of fodder, to improve milk yields and to provide adequate feed during the less productive months of winter.

Effective transport infrastructure was essential for dairy products to reach their desired markets. The extension of Queensland's rural railway network enabled more efficient transportation of dairy produce, facilitating the establishment of local butter and cheese factories in close proximity to railway lines. The first shipment of butter to Britain occurred in 1895 and from 1903, government subsidisation of a fortnightly shipping service to the United Kingdom improved Queensland's butter exporting capabilities.

The arrival of the Kilkivan branch railway to Murgon in 1904 was the impetus for the establishment of the township and a catalyst for the rapid expansion of dairying in the surrounding district, then an emerging but relatively small scale industry in the South Burnett.

By the early 1900s, co-operatives, where groups of local producers banded together to establish factories, were becoming the dominant form of ownership of cheese and butter factories, a pattern that defined the Queensland dairy industry for much of the twentieth century. In 1908 Tiaro Dairy Co-operative Company was established, with a butter factory built of timber opening in the township in the same year. A significant number of cream suppliers to the factory were from the South Burnett, from areas such as Goomeri, Kilkivan and Murgon. A cream receiving depot was established in Murgon, where cream was forwarded to Tiaro by rail. By 1912, 84 percent of the Tiaro butter factory's cream supply was sourced from the South Burnett and a correspondingly large number of the co-operative's shareholders were from the region. A meeting of shareholders in August 1912 voted to move the factory's operations to Murgon.

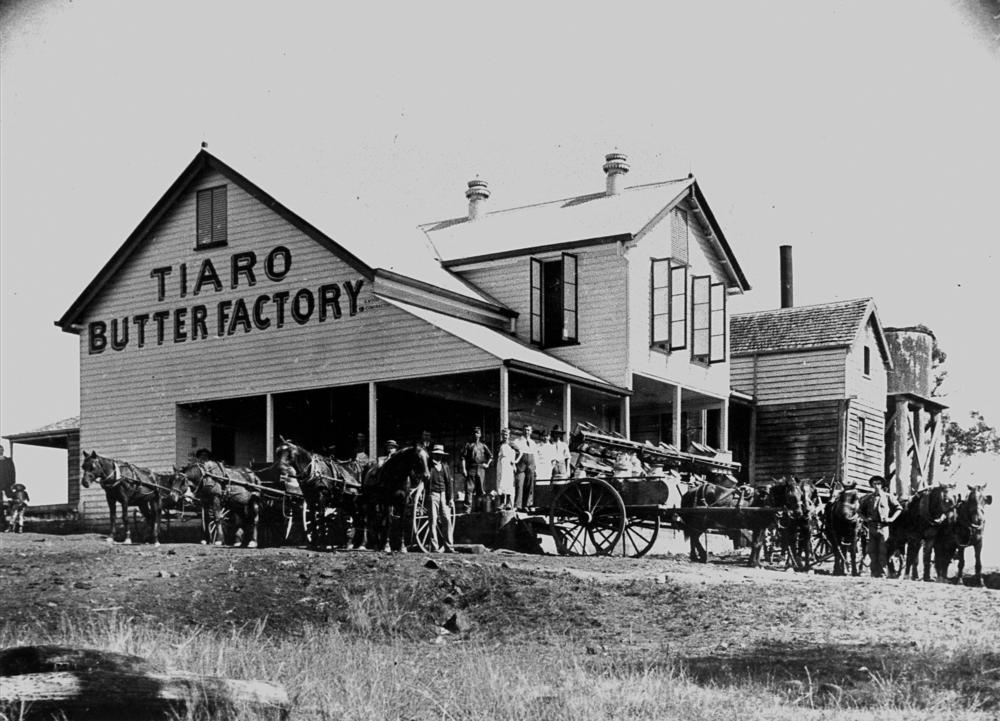
Tiaro Butter Factory which was moved to Murgon in 1913

A site was acquired along Macalister Street, close to Murgon railway station in August 1913 and following the relocation of the Tiaro factory to Murgon, operations commenced in September. Mr George Wood was the builder of the factory while Waugh and Josephson were contractors for the machinery. The capacity of the factory increased from 12 tons at Tiaro to 40 tons of butter per week. In early 1914 the co-operative adopted the name of the South Burnett Co-operative Dairy Company Limited (SBCDC). During the latter half of the year, a railway siding was completed to the factory at a cost of £608/8/1.

Following the establishment of the Murgon butter factory, operations progressively expanded, reflecting the suitability and productivity of the South Burnett district for dairying. This growth is illustrated by the increase in the number of suppliers from 250 in 1913 to 800 by 1929, and in butter production from 252 tons in its first year at Murgon, to 1644 tons in 1928. By 1929, the Wide Bay district, in which the South Burnett was included, was second only to the Moreton district in Queensland milk production.

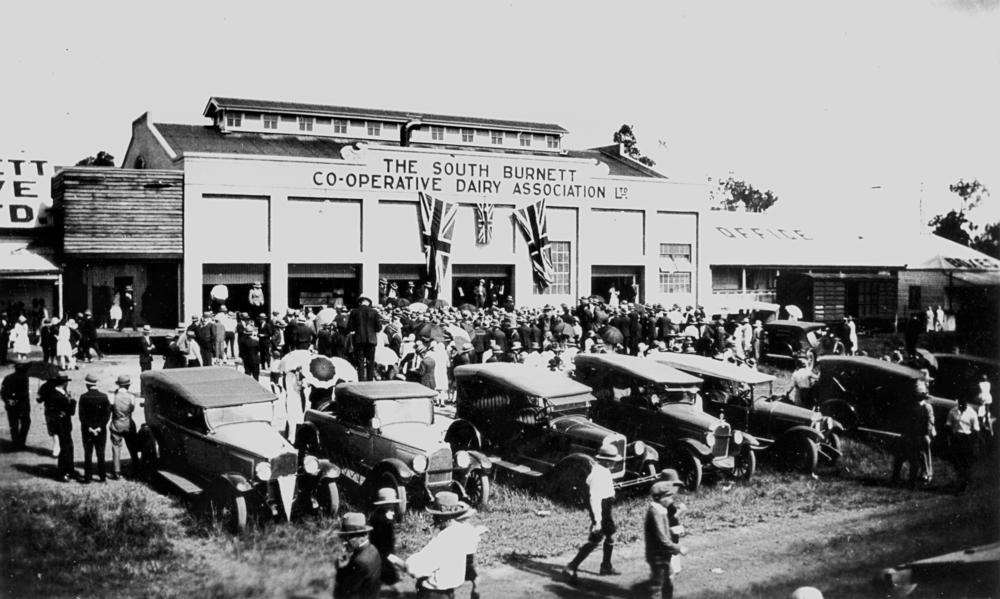
Opening of the South Burnett Cooperative Dairy Association Factory, 9 March 1929

The growth of the South Burnett Co-operative's processing activities necessitated the expansion of the factory in 1929. In order to increase production capacity, the South Burnett Co-operative Dairy Company commenced the construction of a new unit of 35 tons capacity to work in conjunction with the existing unit, and a power plant capable of running both components together or independently. The objective behind the dual factory system was to apply the churning capacity of both factories to the manufacture of butter before noon, with the remainder of the day geared towards the handling and treatment of cream deliveries from suppliers. The Murgon butter factory increased the overall production capacity to 64 tons of butter a week, or 128 tons using double shifts. The dual factory system, driven by a common power plant, was claimed at the time to be "unique in the history of butter production in the Commonwealth".

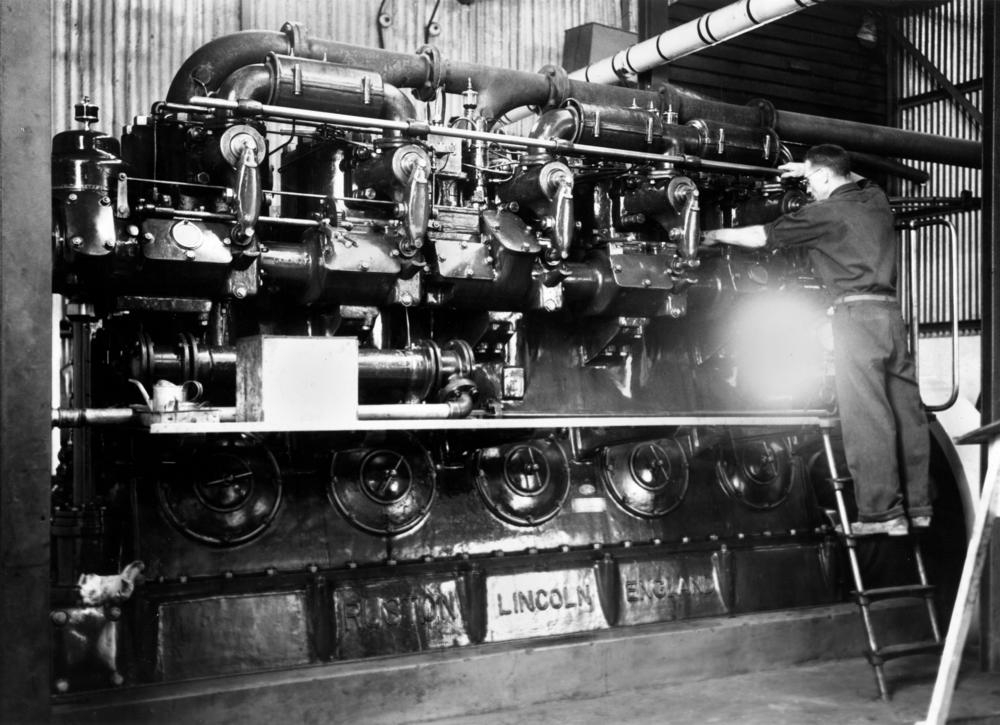
Engine room in the Butter Factory, 1939

Brisbane architect George Hutton, supervised building plans and construction and Mr H. Taylor (also of Brisbane) was the builder. The cost of the remodelling was reported as exceeding £25,000. The largest of the new buildings, built to receive, process and churn cream, was constructed of reinforced concrete with a tubular truss roof, crowned by a lantern roof. The engine/plant room was built to the rear of the larger structure. The new buildings were officially opened on 9 March 1929 by William Forgan Smith, Minister for Agriculture and Stock, with over 1000 invited guests and the township "en-fete" for the occasion.

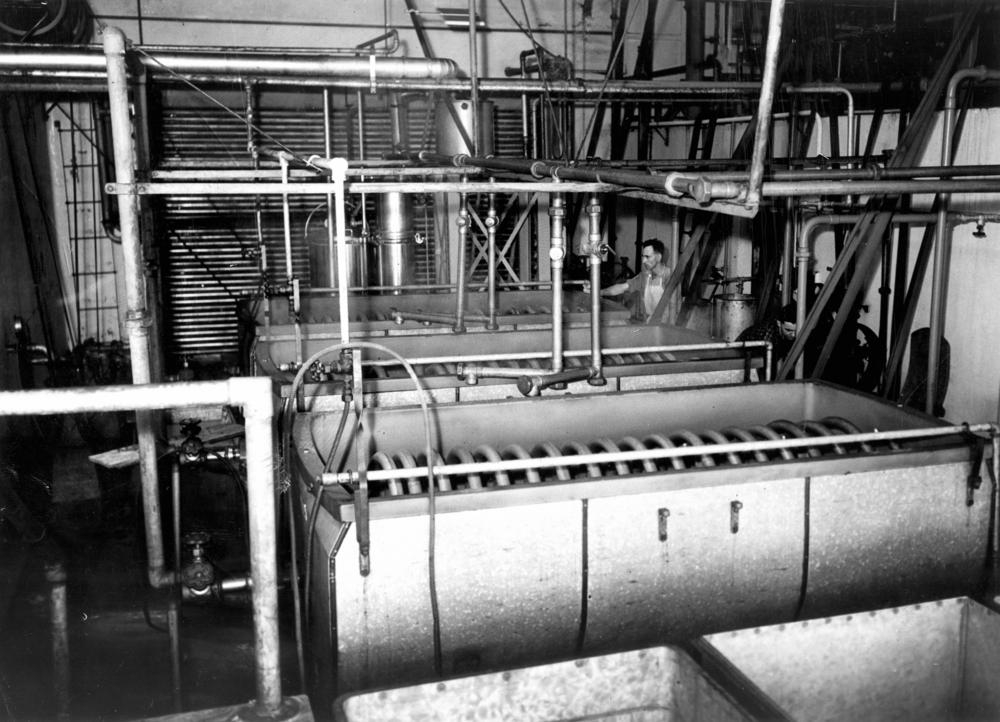
Cream pasteurising and cooling coils,1939

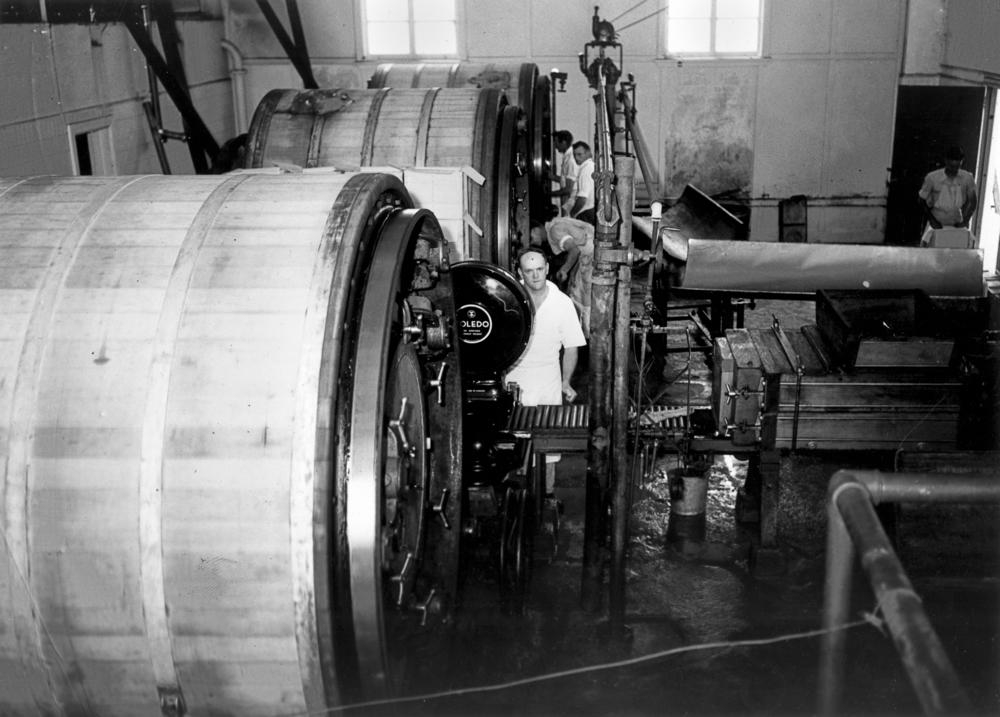
Churns in the Butter Factory, 1939

The building of the new Murgon factory occurred during a period of modernisation for butter manufacturers. By the end of the 1920s most Queensland butter factories had been remodelled or were new buildings of brick and concrete, replacing earlier timber structures. The emphasis on producing high grade butter saw the need for more churns within factories, as the lower temperatures necessary meant churns were turning longer than previously. In addition to upgrading buildings and equipment, greater attention was paid to ensuring butter was of a high standard, through stricter grading and modern processes of pasteurisation and neutralisation. Increasing numbers of trained staff were also working in factories.

The manufacture of butter followed a fairly typical process at factories throughout Queensland. Once cream cans were received and weighed, the cream was tested to determine its grading (choice, 2nd or 3rd), before the cans were emptied into vats and cleaned for return to the supplier. The cream was then pasteurised, cooled and pumped to storage vats, before being sent to the churns. The butter was refrigerated, parcelled into butter boxes and forwarded by rail for export.

The interwar period saw the dairy industry expand greatly in Queensland. Between 1927 and 1937 the total number of dairy cattle rose by 50 percent. By the 1930s, dairying was Queensland's most widely spread agricultural industry and the state's second most profitable export industry from 1936 to 1941, accounting for 20% of primary production. By the late 1930s, around one in eight Queenslanders were living on dairy farms. In 1938 there were five co-operative butter factories in the South Burnett: located at Nanango (Nanango Butter Factory Building), Kingaroy, Murgon, Wondai and Proston. While butter factories enabled the production and export of dairy products, numerous small farms, reliant on family labour to milk herds twice daily for generally modest returns, were the backbone of the industry.

With its increased productive capacities, Murgon butter factory, had by 1931, become Queensland's fourth largest butter producer. Production at the factory reached its peak in 1934, when 2873 tons was manufactured. The opening of the South Burnett Co-operative Dairy Company's branch factory at Proston in 1934 meant a significant number of suppliers west of Murgon sent their cream to the new factory. During 1938–9, a record year, almost 1/3 of all Queensland's butter was produced in the Wide Bay-Burnett, with Murgon the seventh largest producer in the state.

By 1950 the farms of the South Burnett carried 130,000 dairy cows, ten percent of the Queensland total. However, as demand and prices for butter dropped in the 1950s, the decline of dairying accelerated. Butter consumption per capita in Australia dropped from 12.2 kg to 8.3 kg between 1957 and 1972 as margarine increased its market share. The downturn worsened in the 1960s, with a reduction in cream suppliers diminishing output. The transition towards the production of milk rather than cream, requiring larger herds and new equipment, saw many smaller scale farmers leaving the industry. Export opportunities also became restricted, culminating with the end of preferential trade agreements with Britain following its entry into the European Common Market in 1973.

The late 1960s saw the beginning of closures of butter factories in the Burnett region. The Proston Butter Factory, a branch of the SBCDA, closed in 1967. The Maryborough Co-operative Dairy Company closed their branch factories at Wondai and Biggenden in February 1969. By 1976 dairy farmers in the South Burnett numbered under 400 and of these, 211 were bulk milk suppliers. The average age of a dairyman was 55 and two dairy producers were leaving the industry per week.

The Murgon butter factory's diversification into dairy products other than butter from the 1940s enhanced the longevity of SBCDA operations compared to other factories which became increasingly vulnerable to closure from the 1960s. Cheese making commenced at the factory in late 1942 in response to wartime demand, as occurred at the Kingaroy, Nanango and Wondai butter factories. While cheese making ended during or shortly after the war at most of these places, Murgon maintained this production until the 1990s. In 1948 pasteurised bottled milk sales commenced and in 1953, the earliest part of the complex was remodelled and a modern pasteurisation and bottling plant was installed. In 1950 the office was re-established in new brick and concrete premises opposite the factory in Macalister St, with the former office building operating as the co-operative's trading arm from 1951. This was followed in 1952 with the construction of a dairy research laboratory, staffed by members of the Department of Agriculture and Stock, adjacent to the new office. In 1960 a new building was constructed for the production of buttermilk powder, produced from the liquid by-product of butter churning.

With the closure of the Nanango and Kingaroy butter factories in 1977, all cream supplies were diverted to Murgon factory, the last remaining dairy factory in the South Burnett. 1978 saw the opening of new milk processing facilities, followed by the manufacture of skim milk from 1979, and later, the production of flavoured milk drinks. In 1983, 2.7 million litres of milk was processed through the Murgon plant, and 813 tonnes of cheese and 250 tonnes of butter were manufactured on-site. During 1989–90 the milk processing component of the operation was sold to Queensland United Foods (QUF), resulting in local milk supplies being sent to Nambour. The SBCDA (later changed to Burnett Valley Ltd) were able to procure milk from QUF, which allowed for Murgon cheese to be continued to be manufactured, albeit in a much reduced capacity. By 1995 butter production had ceased, and a decline in demand for the cheddar cheese forced the closure of the Murgon factory, marking the end of dairy processing at the site.

The former Murgon Dairy Factory was purchased in 1998 by Clovely Estate and since this time has been utilised for wine making, an industry that has developed in the South Burnett since the early 1990s.

== Description ==
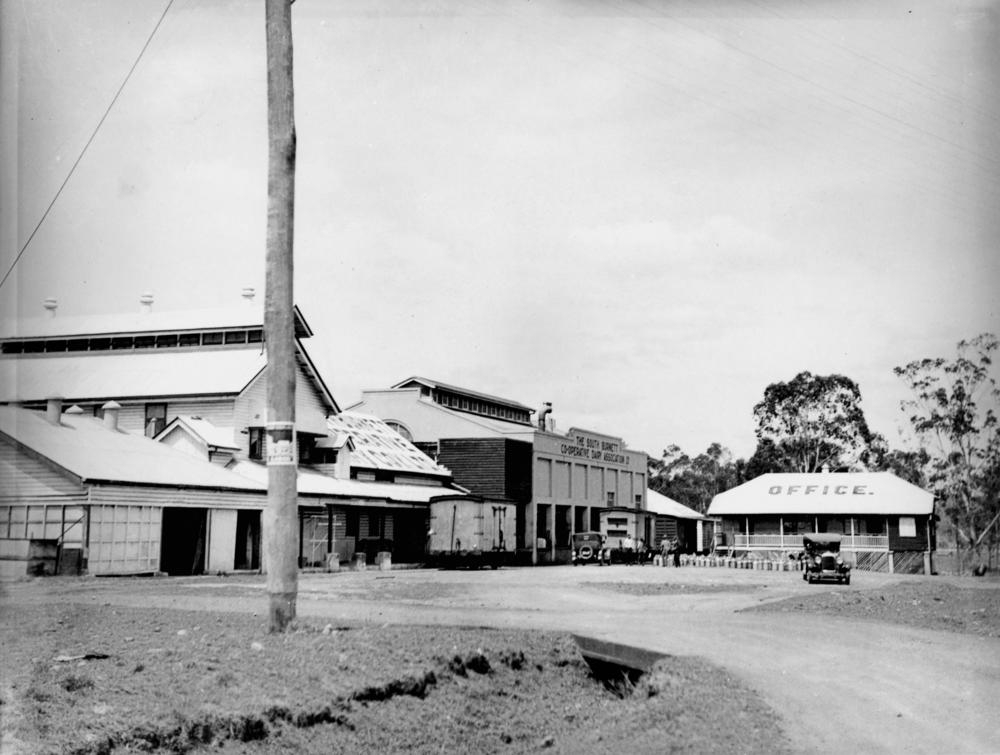
South Burnett Co-operative Dairy Association Ltd Factory, Murgon, circa 1935

The former Murgon Butter Factory stands to the corner of Macalister and McLucas Streets in the southern outskirts of Murgon, adjacent to the formation of the Kilkivan/Kingaroy railway line. The site is a complex of buildings and structures tightly assembled with the main entrance from Macalister Street arriving to a rectangular bitumen-paved yard from which the loading dock of the factory worked. The site is notable for the buildings and structures surviving from the various eras of the dairy processing business including the relocated former Tiaro Butter Factory, main building (1929), plant room, boiler shed and stack.

=== Main building (1929) ===
Fronting the loading yard to Macalister Street, the main building is a rectangular concrete shed distinguished by decorative stepped parapets which screen a gable roof clad with corrugated metal sheeting. The north-west elevation is divided into seven bays each housing recessed blind panels to the upper level and openings within the recessed panels to the exterior loading dock. Two dock level bays accommodate nine-light casement windows and the balance have either large timber doors or fixed timber panels. The decorative stepped parapet to this elevation contains the lettering "The South Burnett Co-operative Dairy Association Ltd" framed by moulded decorative scrolls to each side. The north-east elevation is divided into three bays, one of which has a large timber door opening onto the dock which extends through the space joining the main building and the earlier Tiaro building. This elevation is distinguished by a glazed semi-circular window within the stepped parapet. The south-west elevation has three blind bays and a blind semi-circular window within the parapet. The south-east elevation is part concrete and part timber framed clad with corrugated metal sheeting and houses a large modern roller door.

The roof is framed with steel trusses and the ceiling is lined with a particle board sheeting joined with cover strips. The shed has a concrete floor throughout and a raised concrete dock (parts covered with red tiles) runs around the north-east and north-west sides. A narrow roof vent with fixed glazed windows and timber louvres runs along the ridge.

A concrete loading dock sheltered by a metal awning supported by metal posts runs along the north-west side of the buildings to the Macalister Street yard, from the southern corner of the main building (1929) to the northern corner of the earlier former Tiaro butter factory building. Siding railway tracks from the nearby Kilkivan/Kingaroy line run parallel to the dock.

=== Former Tiaro butter factory structures ===
Timber framed and clad and sheltered by gable roofs clad with corrugated iron, the two rectangular structures surviving from the former Tiaro butter factory stand to the Macalister Street yard of the complex south-east of the modern besser block shed standing to the north corner. Facing north-west, the northern building is distinguished by a narrow blind roof vent running along the ridge while the southern building has a narrow ridge roof vent with fixed timber louvres. These structures accommodate a number of spaces associated with dairy product processing including cold and salt rooms and are composed of brick and concrete partitions and posts, timber floors, and concrete floors and ceilings. Some rooms have coved ceilings of a particle board sheeting joined with cover strips.

Modern cold rooms and laboratory facilities occupy the northern part of the former external dock to Macalister Street.

The space between the earlier Tiaro buildings and the main building (1929) is sheltered by a skillion roof and is open to the dock.

=== Other earlier structures ===
Other earlier structures associated with butter and milk product processing include a rectangular timber shed to the McLucas Street side and a small timber shed with twin gable roofs standing south of the stack.

==== Plant Room ====
A rectangular steel framed and concrete shed sheltered by a gable roof clad with corrugated metal sheeting, the plant room stands to the middle of the site. The south-west wall is concrete with a corrugated iron gable infill; the concrete block north-east wall has a fibrous cement sheet gable infill and the side walls are concrete to half height, the balance clad with corrugated iron. The interior concrete walls are plastered and painted, a dado line separating the upper and lower portions. A concrete floor runs throughout and low concrete upstands accommodate various pieces of machinery. The timber framed roof is unlined and accommodates a narrow ridge vent with fixed glazed windows and timber louvres. Two large 20-light steel framed windows punctuate the north-west wall and a double timber door opens to the south-east. A later cold room extension sheltered by a skillion roof sits off the south-east side.

An array of plant including engines, pulleys and belts, pipes, gauges, valves, exhaust fans and equipment associated with the ammonia chilling process is accommodated in the shed.

==== Boiler shed and stack ====
Two cylindrical metal boilers with brick fireboxes framed with steel strapping are housed in a rectangular timber-framed shed sheltered by a hipped roof and clad with corrugated iron. The fireboxes have metal fronts with a number of hatch openings. Each firebox connects by a brick tunnel to the stack standing to the south-east.

A concrete floor runs throughout the shed and there is a short run of trolley rails adjacent to the fireboxes. The south-west elevation is relieved by three large unglazed window openings. The shed accommodates plant and equipment associated with the boilers including ladders, gantries, pipes and valves.

The tall brick stack is square in plan, tapers to the top, and is bound by metal strapping. The stack is distinguished by stepped cornices to the plinth and crown.

==== Modern structures ====
Three later besser block buildings associated with the dairy processing business - one to the north corner of the site and two south-east of the former Tiaro structures - are not considered to be of heritage significance.

The site accommodates a number of recent structures that relate to the present wine making business including tanks and storage and cold rooms which are not of heritage significance.

== Heritage listing ==
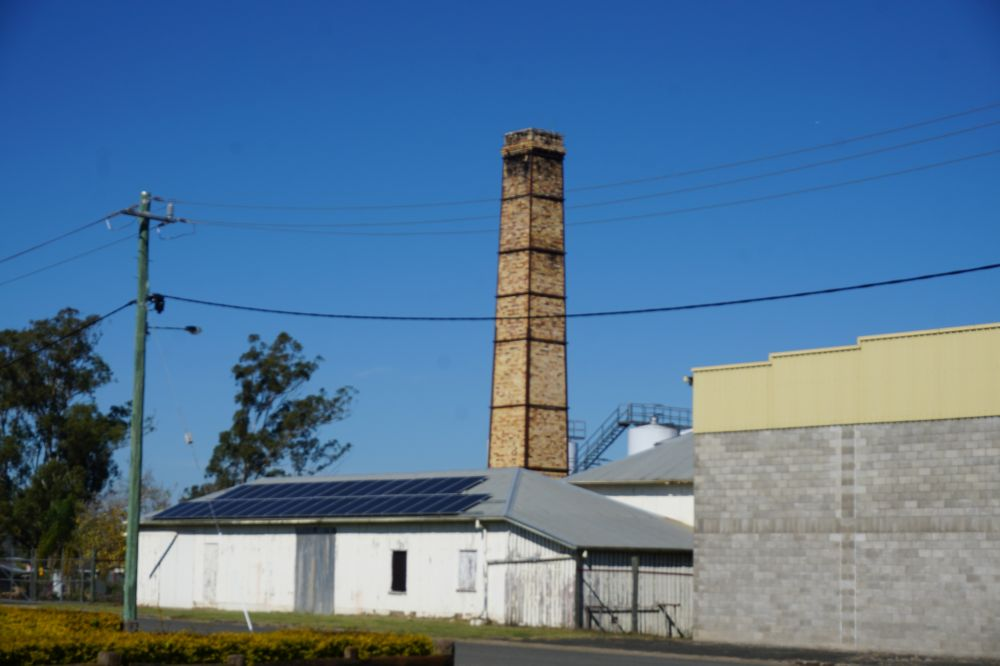
Chimney, 2019

South Burnett Co-operative Dairy Association Factory (former) was listed on the Queensland Heritage Register on 9 November 2012 having satisfied the following criteria.

The place is important in demonstrating the evolution or pattern of Queensland's history.

The South Burnett Co-operative Dairy Association Factory (former) in Murgon, a site used for dairy production from 1913 to 1995, is important in demonstrating the growth and evolution of the Queensland's dairy industry during the twentieth century. The factory was one of Queensland's largest butter producers during the dairying boom of the interwar period and throughout its history was one of the Wide Bay-Burnett's largest and most important dairy manufacturing outlets.

The remaining fabric of the Tiaro butter factory (1908) shifted to Murgon in 1913, reflects the rapid increase in dairy farming in the South Burnett region in the early 1900s, while the 1929 extension of the factory, illustrates the response to the ongoing expansion of cream production and the adoption of modern manufacturing processes in Queensland butter factories during the interwar period. Adaptations and additions to the factory from the 1940s onwards reflect the shift from concentrating on butter manufacturing to processing cheese and milk products, in response to the changing market requirements of Queensland's dairy industry.

The place is important in demonstrating the principal characteristics of a particular class of cultural places.

The South Burnett Co-operative Dairy Association Ltd Factory (former) is important in demonstrating the principal characteristics and processes of a dairy factory. The place is situated adjacent to a railway line, formerly served by a siding to enable transportation of its products. The internal arrangement of interconnected buildings incorporate loading areas for receiving dairy supplier's produce, large rooms used at different periods of its history to manufacture butter, milk and cheese products, and cold storage and packing areas. The 1929 engine room and its remaining fittings (ammonia compressor and piping), and other extant elements of the factory's plant (large brick chimney, boilers, sheds) demonstrate the industrial requirements of the complex over time.
