= Maggie Millar =

Australian actress (born 1941)

- Born: 6 January 1941 (age 85); Strathfield, New South Wales, Australia
- Other name: Maggie Miller
- Education: Royal Academy of Dramatic Art
- Occupation: Actress
- Years active: 1961–2018
- Known for: Prisoner; Neighbours Bellbird; The Sullivans
- Children: 1

Maggie Millar (born 6 January 1941) is an Australian actress, artist and writer. She has a distinguished acting career in theatre and in radio and television, she is best known for her roles in television series including cult drama Prisoner as Marie Winter and Neighbours as Reverend Rosie, among many.

== Early life and education ==
Millar was born in Strathfield, New South Wales, Australia. She was an adopted child, though not aware of the fact until she was 17.

After winning a scholarship to a small drama school in Sydney, Millar toured Australia with a professional theatre company. In 1961, she joined the English Old Vic Company when they toured Australia with Vivien Leigh.

Moving to London, England, Millar won a further scholarship to train at the Royal Academy of Dramatic Art. gaining the Gertrude Lawrence award in her graduation year. and the Erik Award (an annual drama critics' award for professional theatre in Melbourne) for Best Actress in 1967.

== Career ==
=== Television ===
Millar is best-known for playing tough, long-term inmate Marie Winter in Prisoner (1981–1984), and Reverend Rosie Hoyland in Neighbours (2002–2003).

Millar started her career in Australia with appearances on the numerous Crawford Production police dramas including Hunter (1968–69), Division 4 (1973) Matlock Police (1972–1975), and Cop Shop (1981).

After several guesting roles, she was given the more long-term role as Dr. Georgia Moorhouse in the local ABC rural series Bellbird (1972–1977), and then as Elizabeth Bradley in The Sullivans (1981).

She had guest roles also in A Country Practice (1991), and Blue Heelers (2003).

Millar won the 1976 Logie Award for Best Individual Performance by an Actress for Homicide episode "The Life and Times of Tina Kennedy". The same performance earned her the 1976 Sammy Award for Best Actress in a Single Television Performance.

The BBC reported in 2002 that more than 700 people backed a campaign to keep Millar's character Rosie Hoyland in Neighbours after producers announced the character was to be written out.

In addition to her TV work, Millar has been a part of many ABC Radio programmes.

She has worked in theatre productions including role with the Melbourne Theatre Company

=== Film ===
Millar appears in several Australian feature films. Her first, in 1977, was The Mango Tree, with Geraldine Fitzgerald and Robert Helpmann. Others include 1983 racehorse biopic Phar Lap, and 1988 film Evil Angels (a.k.a. A Cry in the Dark), the story of Lindy Chamberlain, starring Meryl Streep and Sam Neill.

Television films include unconventional murder drama Pieta (1987), and Nicole Kidman comedy The Bit Part (1988).

== Personal life ==
Millar has been married twice. Her first husband was from Germany. Together they had a son, Benjamin. After divorcing in 1976, Millar met theatre critic-turned-primary school teacher Ian Robinson, and they married in 1984.

A 1981 magazine article reported that Millar at one stage quit showbusiness to work for Jigsaw – an organisation that aims to reunite natural parents with their adopted offspring – the organisation having enabled her to make contact with her own birth mother.

In 2000, Millar held a first art exhibition of her pastel works at Chapel Off Chapel, Melbourne.

In 2001, Millar was diagnosed with type 2 diabetes. The diagnosis prompted her to approach writer and actor Alan Hopgood (her on-screen husband in Bellbird) with a storyline about diabetes, which Hopgood turned into a play titled A Pill, A Pump and A Needle.

Millar was inducted into the Victorian Honour Roll of Women in 2007. Alongside her acting career, Millar's community and campaigning contributions were recognised. Her experience of being an adopted child led her in adult life to take an active part in a long campaign to change the law in Australia to give adoptees access to their birth records. She did volunteer work at a support system for young drug addicts, and she served for several years on advisory committees in NSW and Victoria with the aim of helping women experiencing difficulties with body image and ageing. Millar has published articles about issues connected with her community work.

== Credits ==
=== Television ===
Year	Title	Role	Notes
1962	Consider Your Verdict	Lydia Durant	Episode: "Queen Versus Blair" (S1.E72)
1968–1969	Hunter	Helen Dempsey, Denise Mitchell, Verna	Episodes: "The Friend in Need File" (S1.E25), "A Dark Reunion" (S1.E42), "The Strangers" (S1.E59)
1968, 1973, 1975	Homicide	Sally Hendricks, Larch Ford, Ruth Reid, Betty Kennedy	Episodes: "Break-out" (S5.E42), "I Killed Amanda Clarke" (S10.E12), "The Last Way Out" (S10.E18), "The Life and Times of Tina Kennedy" (S12.E25)
1972, 1975	Matlock Police	Betty, Sue Powell	Episodes: "The Meek Shall Inherit" (S2.E83), "The Least We Can Do" (S5.E211)
1972–1977	Bellbird	Georgia Moorehouse	Regular role: 684 episodes
1973	Division 4	Shirley Ward	Episode: "A Matter of Survival" (S5.E24)
1973	Ryan	Joan Palmer	Episode: "Tribe" (S1.E10)
1976	Logie Awards of 1976	Guest – Herself	TV special
1978-1980	Cop Shop	Laura Cooper, Trish Butler, Coral Simpson	Episodes: "1.55", "1.56", "1.119", "1.120", "1.243", "1.244"
1980-1981	The Sullivans	Elizabeth Bradley	68 episodes: 757 to 824
1981–1984	Prisoner	Marie Winter	Recurring role: 38 episodes (S3.E32-33/80-81; S4.E1-23; S6.E45-55)
1983	Carson's Law	Alma Gunn	Episodes: 71 "Street Games, Night Moves"; 72 "Deceptions"
1984	Special Squad	Joyce	Episode: 30 "The Patchwork"
1985	The Fast Lane	Simone Duxbury	Episode: 4 "Tertiary Sisyphus"
1985	Possession	Claudia Valenti	Regular role: 23 Episodes
1986	The Local Rag	Alex Steel	TV film
1987	In Between	Bet	Episode: "Part 3"
1987	Pieta / Shadow Play	Mary Verton	TV film
1988	The Bit Part	Molly	TV film
1988	All the Way	Lorna Scott	TV miniseries: 3 episodes
1989	In Melbourne Today	Guest – Herself	TV series: 1 episode
1991	A Country Practice	Sister Evelyn	Episode: "As Time Goes By: Part 1" (S11.E61)
1992	Cluedo	Madame Rosamonda (as Maggie Miller)	Episode: "Madame Rosamonda" (S1.E6)
2002–2003	Neighbours	Rosie Hoyland	Regular role: 81 episodes (Seasons 18–19)
2003	Blue Heelers	Val Trotter	Episode: "Father's Day: Part 1" (S10.E14)
2005	Good Morning Australia	Guest – Herself	TV series: 1 episode
2014	Neighbours	Rosie Hoyland (uncredited)	Episode 1.6985

=== Film ===
Year	Title	Role	Notes
1977	The Mango Tree	Laura Montague	
1983	Phar Lap	May Holmes	
1985	Niel Lynne / Best Enemies	Jo Lynne	
1987	Bushfire Moon / Miracle Down Under	Mrs Gullett	
1988	Evil Angels / A Cry in the Dark	Sister	
2016	Malevolence	Laurel	Short

=== Theatre (selected) ===
Year	Title	Role	Notes	Ref.
1967	The Servant of Two Masters	Smeraldina / Clarice	University of Melbourne	
1968	Three Sisters		Russell St Theatre, Melbourne with University of Melbourne	
1968	The Crucible	Elizabeth Proctor	Union House Theatre, Melbourne with MTC	
1978	Roma	Roma	Playbox Theatre, Melbourne with Hoopla Theatre Foundation	
1979	Run, Run Away		La Mama, Melbourne	
1979	Miss Julie	Kristine	Playbox Theatre, Melbourne with Playbox Theatre Company	
	In Duty Bound		MTC	
	The Bourgeois Wedding		MTC	
1980	Big River	Miss Olivia Hindmarsh	Russell St Theatre, Melbourne with MTC	
1981	The Two-Headed Calf	Lady Leokadia Clay	MTC: Pram Factory, Melbourne	
1981	The Dance of Death	Alice	Playbox Theatre, Melbourne with Playbox Theatre Company	
1982	Curse of the Starving Class / Buried Child	Ella Tate	Playbox Theatre, Melbourne with Playbox Theatre Company	
1989	Woman Thy Name Is ...	Rosa	Melbourne Athenaeum with Playbox Theatre Company	
1989	Top End	Rosa	Russell St Theatre, Melbourne with MTC	
1989	A Respectable Wedding / The Proposal	The Wife	Russell St Theatre, Melbourne with MTC	
1989	Dreams in an Empty City	Pauline / Deborah	Playhouse, Melbourne with MTC	
1990	Daylight Saving	Stephanie	Adelaide Festival Centre with MTC	
1992	No Going Back	Lydia	Russell St Theatre, Melbourne with MTC	
1993	Blood Moon	Marina	Theatre Works, Melbourne	
2000	Love Letters	Melissa Gardner	Chapel Off Chapel, Melbourne	
2002	Aladdin (pantomime)	Empress of China	Opera House, York	
2003	Back to Bellbird	Georgia Moorhouse	Kingston Arts Centre, Moorabbin, Victoria	
2003–2004	Cinderella (pantomime)	Fairy godmother	Princess Theatre, Torquay and Queens Hall, Widnes	
2009	Godot: The Wait is Over		Carlton Courthouse Theatre with La Mama, Melbourne	
2014	Scary Tales for Grown-ups	Herself	Royal George Hotel, Kyneton	
2018	Maggie Millar reads Molly Bloom	Molly Bloom	Cowes Uniting Church, Cowes, Victoria	
2018	A Celebration of the Work of John Clarke	Herself	Torquay, Victoria with Torquay Theatre Troupe	
