= Boonah Butter Factory =

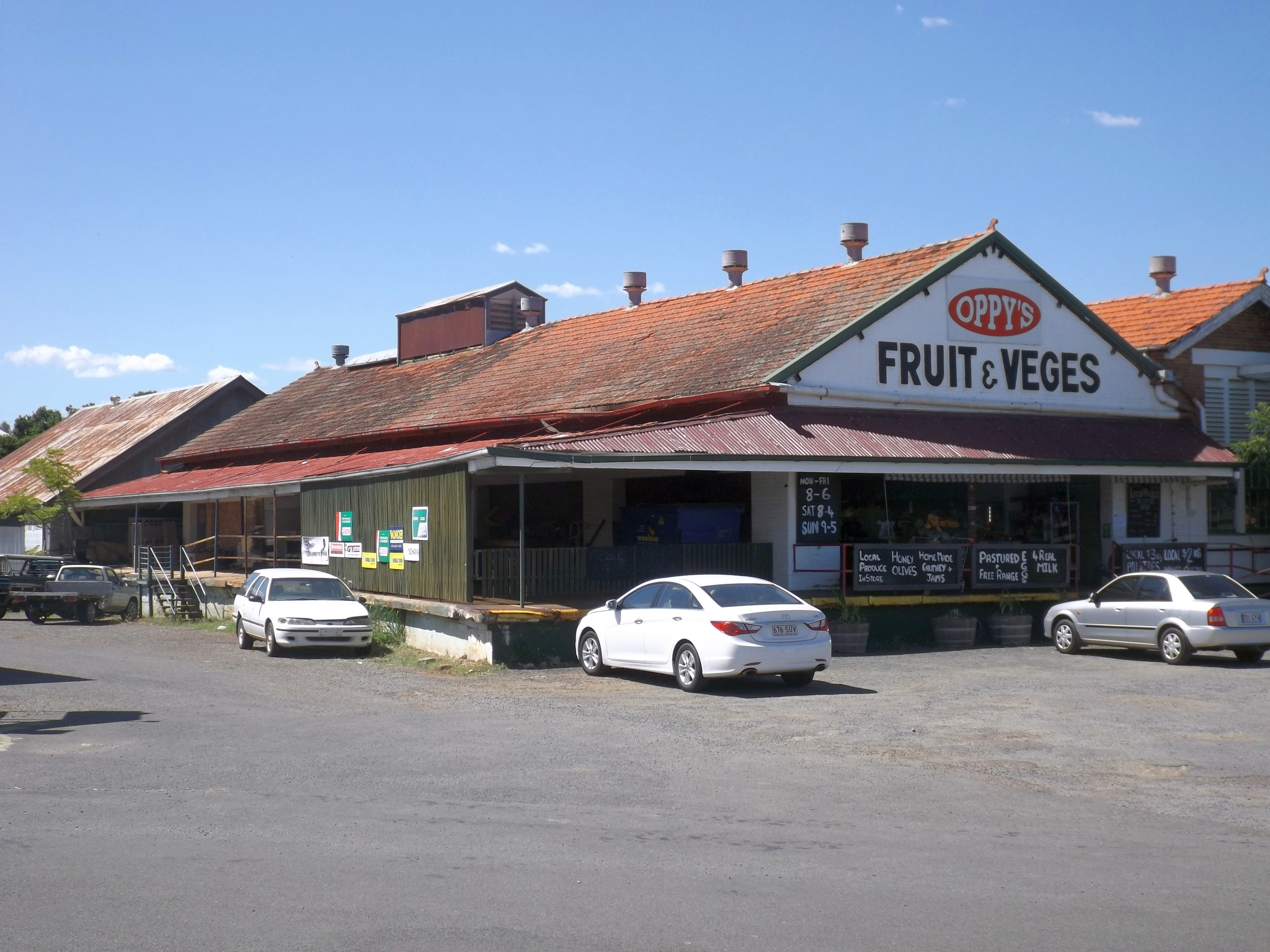
- Part of the site is currently a shop

- Location within Queensland Location within Australia
- 27°59′44″S 152°40′55″E
- Type: food production
- Location: Boonah

History
- Built: July 1916, January 1933
- Built for: Dairy products

Site notes
- Architect(s): Robert Kerr, Duncan Saxelby, T.R Hall and Phillips
- Current use: store, art studio and gallery

The Boonah Butter Factory is a heritage-listed former butter factory in Boonah, Scenic Rim Region, Queensland, Australia. Constructed in 1916, it is a prominent landmark at the intersection of Boonah-Rathdowney Road and Railway Street on the northern entry to Boonah. During the first part of the twentieth century, it was one of the most modern butter factories in the Commonwealth, the largest butter factory in the Southern Hemisphere, had the second highest output of butter in Queensland and was a major supplier of dairy products to Brisbane. The former Boonah Butter Factory office, which is currently the premises of Flavours Cafe, is on the Local Heritage Register of the Scenic Rim Regional Council in acknowledgement of the site's historic, aesthetic and cultural significance.

The Boonah Butter Factory is the sole surviving cream factory or butter factory in Boonah and is one of the most historic buildings in the region. It has served as a studio and gallery space for local and international artists for over twenty years and has been identified by the Scenic Rim Regional Council as a developed attraction in the region. The former loading platform for the factory is a fruit and vegetable store.

The factory was an essential industry in the region. It was a gauge for the progress of the district, responsible for the generation and supply of electrical power to Boonah and responsible for pumping water to tanks throughout the township to assist in fighting fires.

It is the first of two dairy factories known to have been designed, in part, by Thomas Ramsay Hall of the architectural firm T.R. Hall and Phillips and is the only one to remain in situ. The second factory designed by T.R. Hall was constructed in 1936 for the South Coast Co-Operative Dairy Association in Southport and was demolished in 1972 to make way for the Australia Fair shopping centre. The Boonah Butter Factory is one of the four original factories managed by the Queensland Farmers Co-Operative Association, including those located at Grantham, Laidley and Booval.

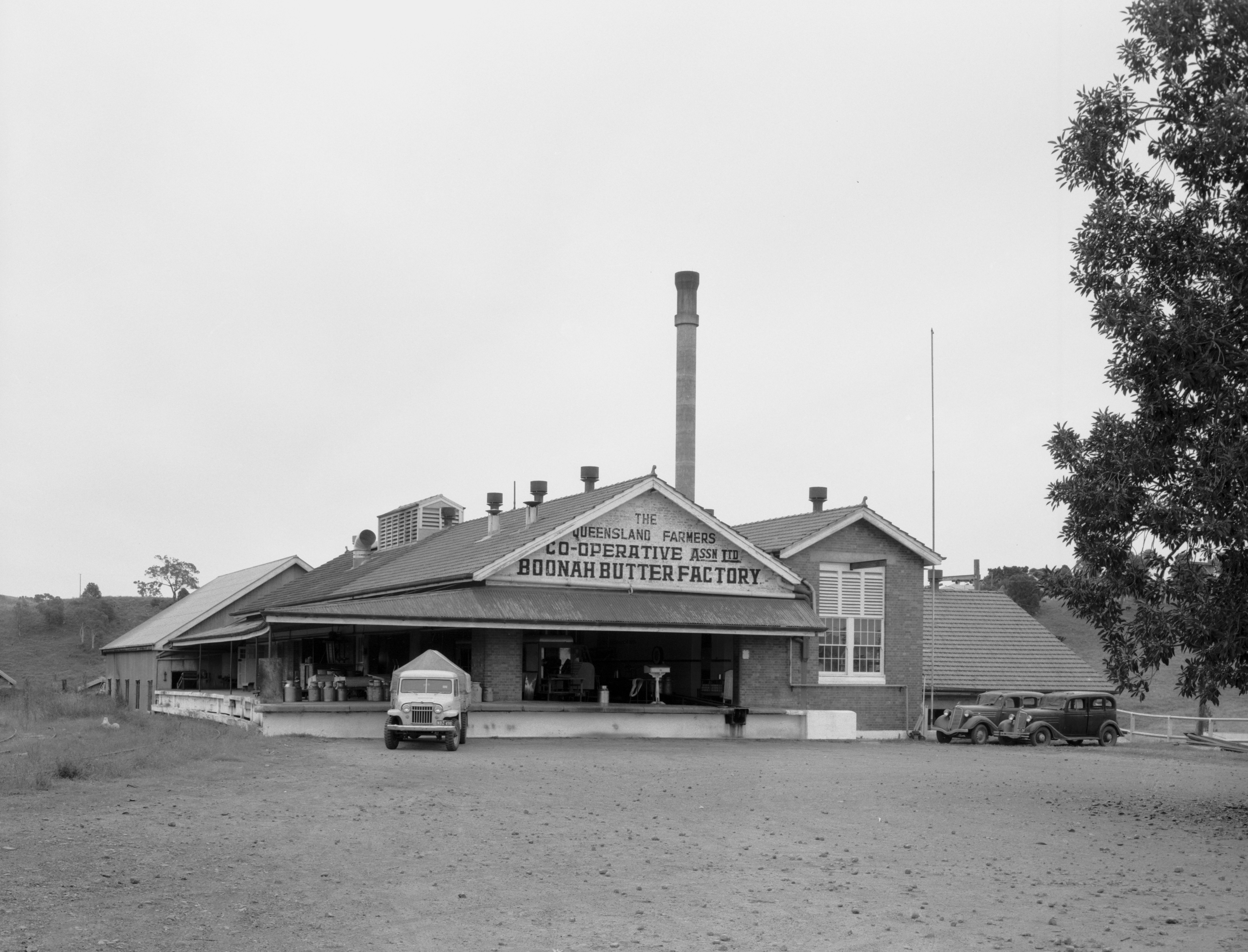
Boonah Butter Factory, 1959

== History ==
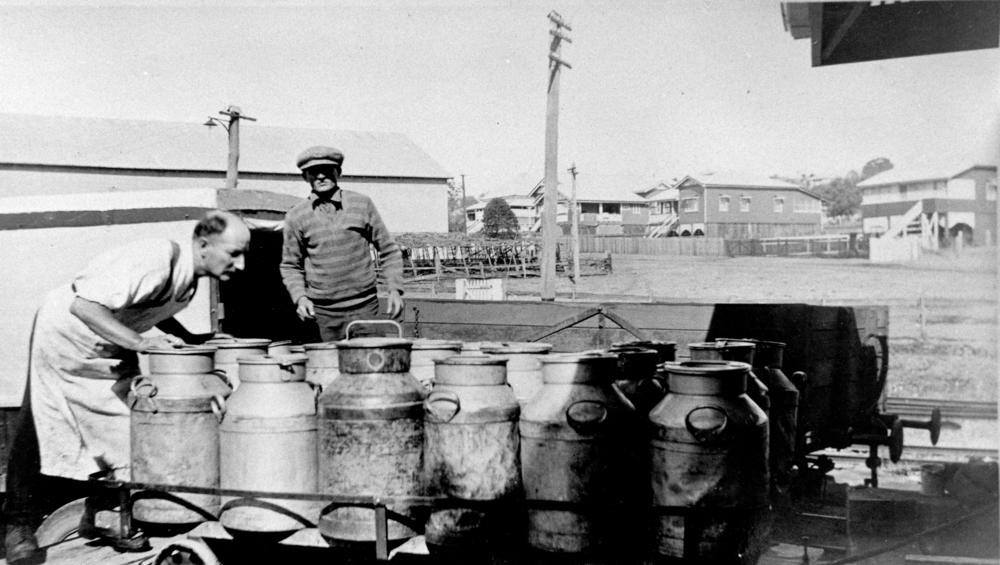
A load of cream cans bound for the Boonah Butter Factory, 1932

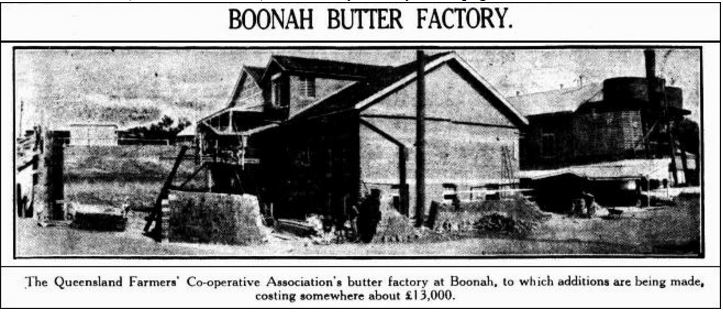
Boonah Butter Factory, 1932

Creameries had an important role in the establishment of the early dairy industry in the region and made a significant contribution to the prosperity and economic stability of Boonah which was one of the earliest areas settled by Europeans after the establishment of Brisbane. In conjunction with local cheese factories like the Trelawney Cheese Factory, which is listed on the Scenic Rim Regional Council Local Heritage Register as a rare example of early dairy technology, they were extremely beneficial to the district.

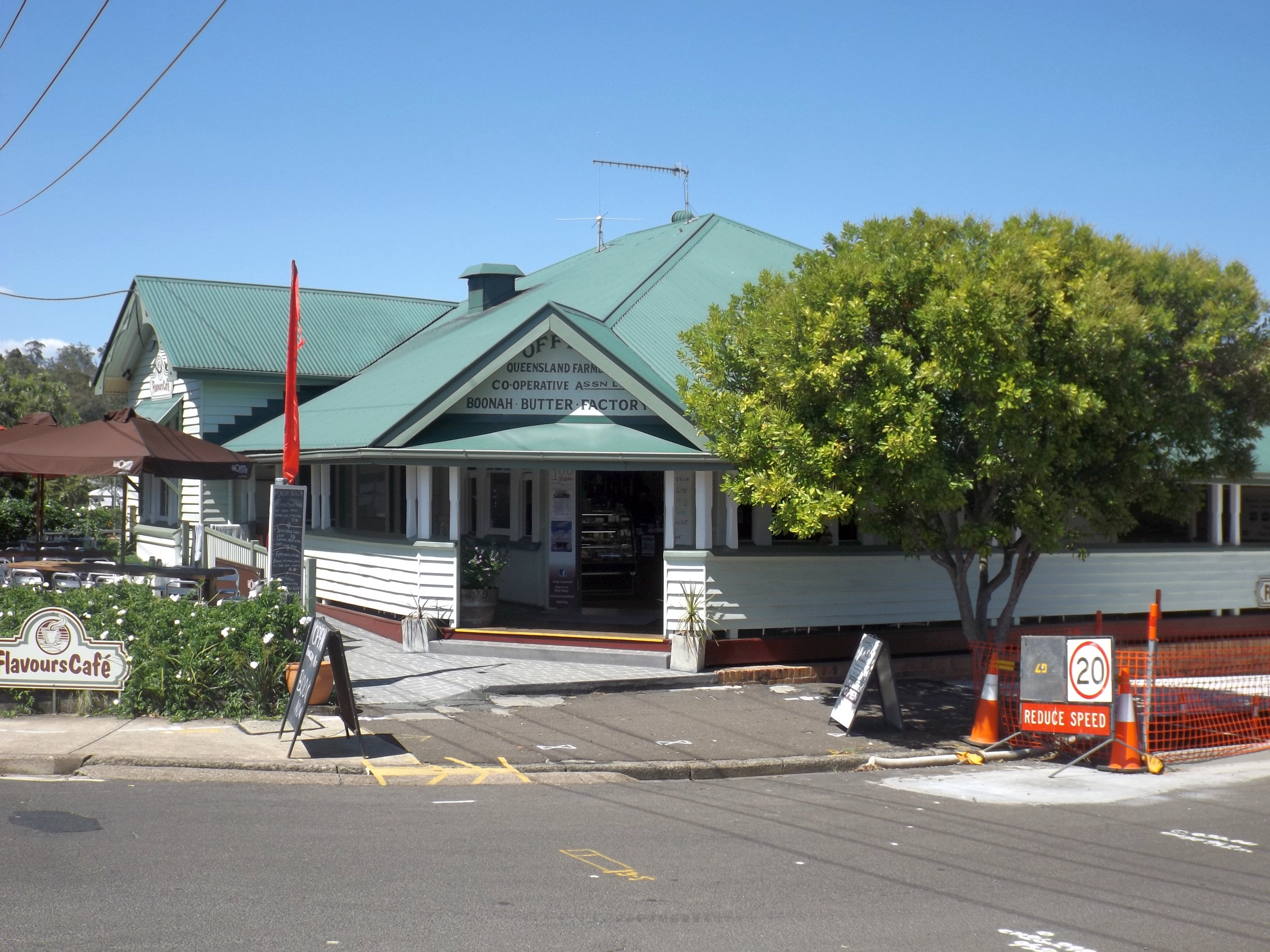
The former office building is now a cafe

The first creamery in Boonah was built by the Central Dairy Company in the vicinity of the current site of the Boonah Butter Factory around 1894. The factory was located across the railway tracks from the township on the hill behind the school ground, with the 7 1/2-acre site 200–300 feet above Boonah offering panoramic views of the countryside. The factory was designed and managed by Samuel Dover who had experience in the industry. Milk from local dairy farmers was delivered to the factory, processed into cream and then transported via rail to the large factories in Brisbane for churning into butter. The residue from the separation of the milk was used as a food source for pigs, which were also an important agricultural industry in the region.

By January 1895, the already successful creamery had been sold to the Lowood Creamery Company which was owned by Howes Bros. and Co. The Boonah Creamery was one of a number of factories in the district owned by the Lowood Creamery Company with other creameries located at Engelsberg, Milford, Rosevale and Anthony.

Despite the success of the creameries, the local farmers wished to have greater control of their own dairy products and pricing. Rather than transport the cream to Brisbane for final processing where the vibration of the train journey could impact the quality, the farmers wished to churn butter in Boonah. There was also a strong desire to remove their reliance on privately owned factories and participate in the cooperative movement in the dairy industry that was gaining momentum in Queensland. To achieve this, a local butter factory operated as a cooperative venture was required.

Despite growing dissatisfaction with the privately owned dairy enterprises, the early factories of the dairy industry encouraged a proactive approach from farmers to improve the yield and quality of the region's milk products. The agricultural and dairy success of the area was directly linked to the community's ability to lobby for land to be set aside for the Boonah Showgrounds in order to hold an Agricultural show to showcase the district's produce and reinforce community spirit. The designer and manager of the creamery, Samuel Dover, was the first secretary of the newly formed Fassifern and Dugandan Pastoral and Agricultural Show Society. The first Boonah Show was held in 1898.

== Site ==
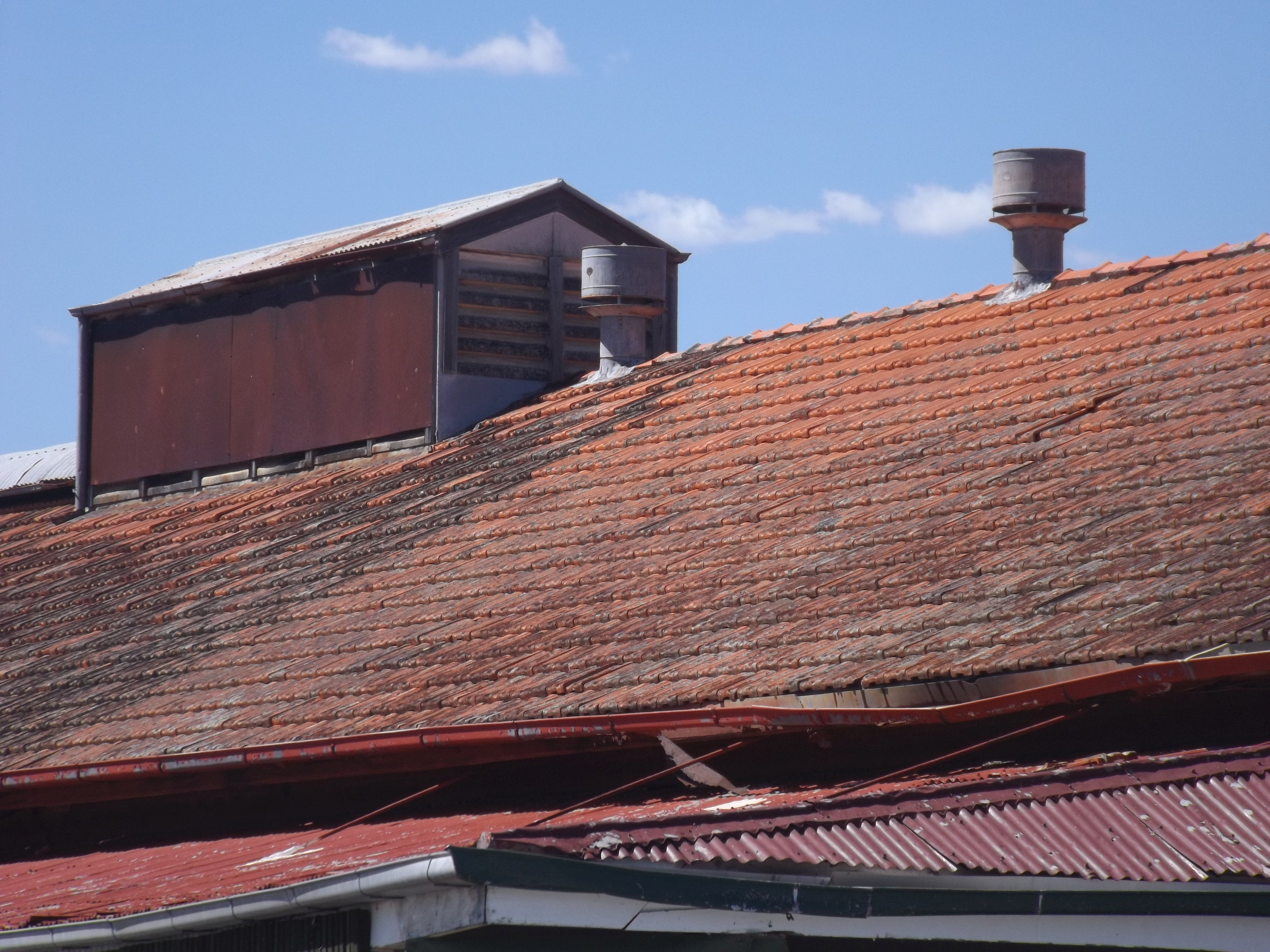
Rooftop, 2016

The first dedicated butter factory in Boonah was built by Samuel Dover in 1900 on property he owned in Church Street neighbouring the Roman Catholic Church. Known as the Fassifern Butter Factory and Ice Works, it was owned by Howes Bros. and employed seven men and collected milk from the various creameries in the area.

The local farmers were dissatisfied with Howes Bros. and, after a series of meetings, decided to form a joint venture between the Boonah Farmers Co-Operative Dairy Co., which had been established in 1899, and the Queensland Farmers Co-Operative Association which had been founded in 1899 and was based at the Booval Butter Factory, also known as the Jacaranda Butter Factory. The Queensland Farmers Co-Operative put a proposal to the Boonah Farmers Co-Operative in June 1905 to guarantee to establish a cooperative butter factory in Boonah and, in November 1905, the Boonah Co-Operative opened a dedicated bank account to build the necessary funds to buy a site. In 1907 the two cooperatives merged and purchased the Fassifern Butter Factory and Ice Works from Howes Brothers. Samuel Dover remained in place as manager and, by 1909, the factory output was larger than any of the other factories controlled by the Queensland Farmers Co-Operative Association.

== Construction ==
Within ten years the site on Church Street was considered too small and poorly positioned. The present site was selected and acquired for £10, 603 on the northern entry to the township adjacent to the railway station and, in both June 1914 and March 1915, tenders were called for the new factory to be constructed. Plans and specifications were available for view at Harding Frew in Brisbane, the offices of John Kerr in Melbourne and, in 1915, the Booval Butter Factory in Ipswich.

The factory was a modern brick building with concrete floors, a roof of Marseilles tiles and a railway siding and platform. The engineering drawings were prepared by the architect Robert Kerr of Melbourne, who was referred to as the 'father' of Victorian dairy industry and had been involved in the erection of approximately 400 butter factories in Australia including the first one in Victoria, from engineering drawings and designs created by Duncan Saxelby, the manager of the Queensland Farmers Cooperative Association. The supervising architect was George Thornhill Campbell-Wilson of Brisbane who was responsible for Hughesville, Eight Mile Plains. The building contractor was Mr. A. S. Jevnes. Samuel Dover continued in the role of manager.

The new butter factory was fitted with state of the art equipment and was officially opened in July 1916 by the Queensland Governor, Sir Hamilton Goold-Adams. During his visit to Boonah, the Governor also unveiled an Honour Board for local men who were serving overseas in World War I. In 1928 additions to the factory were made.

During the early twentieth century the quality of dairy products from the region was well established. In 1931 salted butter from the Boonah Butter Factory was awarded the first prize at the London Dairy Show. By the 1930s, the factory had 900 suppliers and during a visit to Boonah in 1938 by the Prime Minister of Australia, Mr Joseph Lyons, the prominence and quality of butter from the region was mentioned in speeches.

== Redesign ==
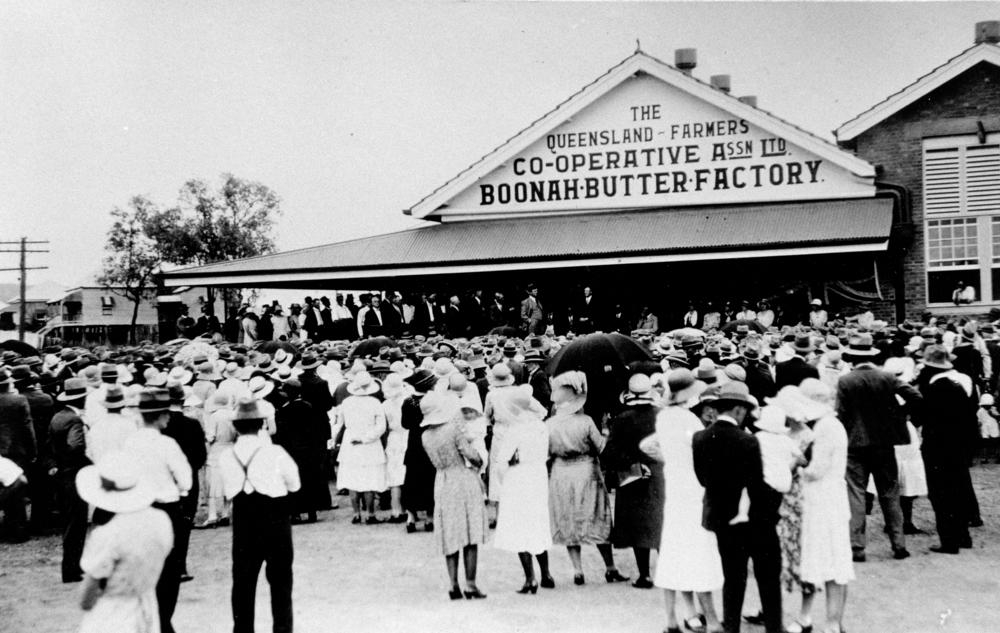
Opening of the addition to the Boonah Butter Factory, 1933

In 1932 tenders were considered for extensive additions to the butter factory. Construction was to take place during the quieter winter months and the new buildings were designed to complement the existing structure. The only improvements made to the building already on the site were to relay the floors with tile and remove the pillars supporting the top floor so that the top floor could be supported with new steel joists.

The Boonah Butter Factory was extended by Messers Stuart Bros. Ltd. of Brisbane following plans created by Thomas Ramsay Hall of the architectural firm of T. R. Hall and Phillips who were also responsible for the Brisbane City Hall, Southport Town Hall and the Boonah Shire Chambers (later demolished). In January 1933 the additions were officially opened by Mr. P. Pease, Minister of Lands.

In 1947, plans for four self-contained two storey shops associated with the factory were approved. In April 1954, manufacture commenced on a new line of products at the butter factory with the introduction of butter milk powder.

== Closure ==
The Boonah Butter Factory closed on 1 March 1974 due to declining production as a result of low prices for milk and shifting agricultural practices in the region. The last batch of butter came off the production line at Boonah at 10:45am. It was packed by Hartley Schumacher with George Kubler, Stan Schlieff, Roydon Kubler and Sel Schneider watching. Milk products from Boonah were subsequently transported to Booval for processing with the majority of employees also transferring to Booval. Booval had ceased operation by 2011 and was demolished by 2016.

The Boonah Butter Factory is the only surviving major industrial site related to the dairy, timber and railway industries of Boonah from the nineteenth and twentieth centuries. The nearby Cossart's Mill at Dugandan was the largest supplier of butter boxes in Australia. Like the butter factory, the sawmill had been a dominant industry and employer in the area. The sawmill was recommended for heritage protection in 1998 as a rare surviving example of a major Queensland sawmill from the mid twentieth century. It was demolished around 2006.

The greatest percentage of freight on the railway line were products from the combined output of the butter factory and sawmill. The Dugandan railway line was closed in 1964 and the tracks and associated infrastructure removed. The original location of the Boonah railway station is marked by a memorial adjacent to the Boonah Butter Factory site.

The Boonah Butter Factory is now part of a network of extant historic or heritage listed butter factories in South East Queensland that have been re-purposed for cultural or community use including the Kingaroy Butter Factory, Nanango Butter Factory, The Downs Co-operative Dairy Association Limited Factory, Kingston Butter Factory and Grantham Butter Factory.
