= The Local Rag (film) =

- Directed by: Keith Wilkes
- Written by: Coral Drouyn
- Produced by: Keith Wilkes
- Starring: Maggie Millar; Peter Cummins
- Production company: ABC
- Distributed by: ABC
- Release date: 1986
- Country: Australia
- Language: English

The Local Rag is a 1986 television film about a suburban newspaper.

It was made as a pilot for a TV series which did not proceed.

== Cast ==
- Maggie Millar as Alex Steel
- Peter Cummins as Phil Bonnard
- Peter Hosking
