= Coral Drouyn =

English Australian actress

- Born: Coral O'Neill; 1944 (age 81–82); Doncaster, South Yorkshire, England, United Kingdom
- Other names: Coral Kelly
- Occupations: Actress; screenwriter; singer; theatre critic
- Years active: 1949, 1960s-2009 (Actress, singer and screenwriter), 2009-present (theatre critic)
- Relatives: Jack Haig (uncle)

Coral Drouyn née O'Neill, (born 1944), also billed as Coral Kelly, is an English Australian actress, singer and screenwriter/story editor best known for her work in television, including Prisoner, Neighbours, Blue Heelers, Pacific Drive and Home and Away.

== Biography ==
Drouyn was born in Doncaster, South Yorkshire, to Terry O'Neill, an actor and son of an Irish tenor, and Peggy Haig, an actress. Her maternal uncle was the British actor Jack Haig and her maternal grandparents were Charles Coppin and Bertha Baker, both of whom were music hall performers billed as "Haig and Esco".

At the age of four, she appeared in an uncredited role as "Precocious Child" in the Hollywood film I Was a Male War Bride.

Drouyn emigrated to Australia in the 1960s, where she wrote comedy for her father's Melbourne-based program "Time for Terry" and worked as a singer, while writing material for theatre restaurants.

During her acting career, when she was often billed as Coral Kelly, she featured in the ill-fated TV soap opera Arcade as health studio receptionist Consuela McPhee.

Retiring from acting, Drouyn began writing for television, working as a scriptwriter for Grundy Productions series such as The Restless Years, Prisoner and Neighbours. During her time on Prisoner, Drouyn worked her way up from freelance writer to in-house story editor, creating characters and stories before leaving the series prior to its 600th episode.

Drouyn subsequently was involved in the creation of serial Pacific Drive before performing story editor duties on Blue Heelers and Home and Away.

Her book Big Screen, Small Screen, detailing the craft skills involved in screen-writing, was published in 1994.

Drouyn now works as a theatre critic.

Beginning in 2022, Drouyn has given extensive interviews with podcast series 'Talking Prisoner' where she has discussed in detail her creative work on Prisoner.

== Credits ==
Writer, script & production credits
Year	Title	Work	Notes
1980–85	Prisoner (Prisoner: Cell Block H)	Writer	Seasons 2–7 (63 episodes)
1983	Prisoner (Prisoner: Cell Block H)	Script editor	Season 5 (3 episodes)
1983	Prisoner (Prisoner: Cell Block H)	Storyline	Season 5 (196 episodes)
1984	Prisoner (Prisoner: Cell Block H)	Story editor	Season 6–7 (138 episodes)
1985	Neighbours	Writer	Season 1 (5 episodes)
1986	The Local Rag	Writer	TV movie
1988	The Gerry Connolly Show	Writer	Season 1 (2 episodes)
1992	Redheads	Script editor	Feature film
1995–2004; 2003–05	Home and Away	Writer	Seasons 8, 15, 17 (8 episodes)
1995–2004; 2003–05	Home and Away	Script supervisor	Seasons 16–18 (680 episodes)
1996–97	Pacific Drive	Writer	Seasons 1–2 (388 episodes)
1999	Chuck Finn	Writer	Season 1 (1 episodes)
1999	Change of Heart	Writer	Feature film
1999–2000	Blue Heelers	Writer	Season 7 (2 episodes)
1999–2000	Blue Heelers	Story producer	Seasons 6–7 (6 episodes)
2001	Wild Kat	Writer	Season 1 (2 episodes)
2003	Home and Away: Hearts Divided	Writer	Direct-to-video special
2004	Parallax	Writer	Season 1 (1 episode)
2005–06	Streetsmartz	Writer	Seasons 1–3 (9 episodes)
2005–06	Streetsmartz	Script producer	Seasons 1–3
2009	Stormworld	Writer	Season 1 (3 episodes)

Acting credits
Year	Title	Role	Notes
1949	I Was a Male War Bride	Precocious Child	Feature film (uncredited)
1954	The Belles of St. Trinian's	Schoolgirl	Feature film (uncredited)
1980	Arcade	Consuela McPhee	Season 1 (35 episodes)
1982	Ginger Meggs	Mrs. Sarah Meggs	Feature film

Self appearances
Year	Title	Notes
2022	Talking Prisoner	Podcast series (8 episodes)
