= Pieta (1988 film) =

- Directed by: Monique Schwarz
- Starring: Maggie Millar; Sally Cooper
- Country of origin: Australia
- Original language: English

Production
- Running time: 76 mins
- Production company: Ebony Films

Original release
- Network: Australian Broadcasting Corporation
- Release: 31 January 1988

Pieta is a 1988 Australian Broadcasting Corporation television film about a woman who commits murder. It was also known as Shadowplay.
