= Nanango Butter Factory Building =

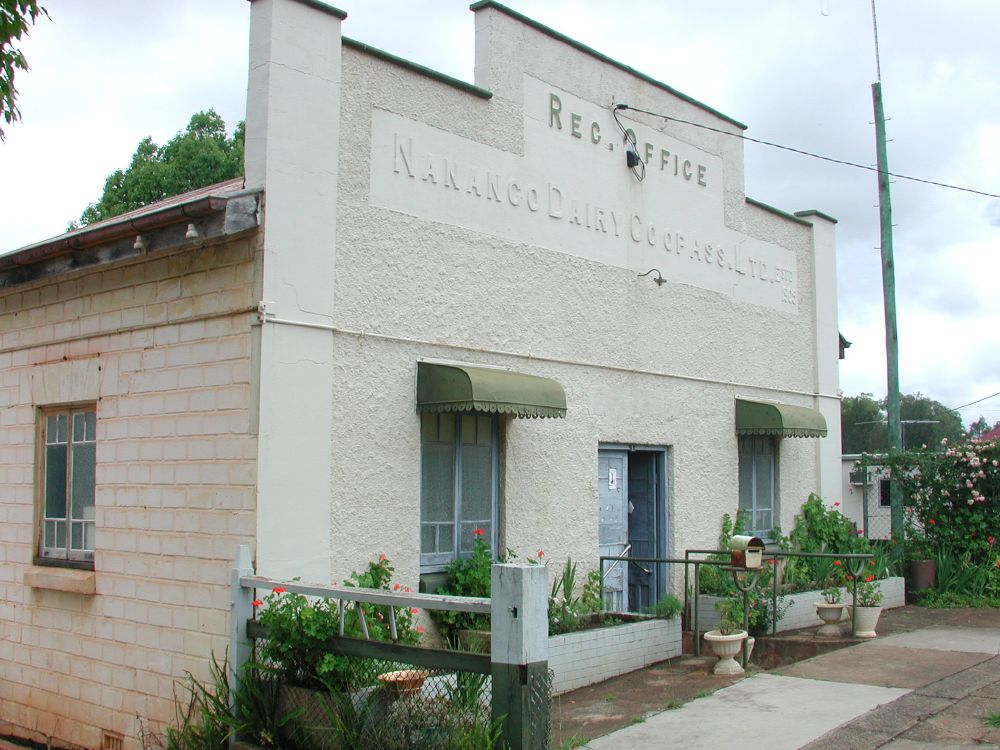
- Office at the Nanango Butter Factory

- Location within Queensland Location within Australia
- 26.6698°S 152.0034°E
- Location: George Street, Nanango, South Burnett Region, Queensland, Australia

History
- Design period: 1919–1930s (interwar period)
- Built: 1927

Queensland Heritage Register
- Official name: Nanango Butter Factory Building
- Type: state heritage (built)
- Designated: 3 June 2005
- Reference no.: 602525
- Significant period: 1927–1953 (fabric); 1906–1986, 1933–1948 (historical)
- Significant components: shed/s, tank – water, cold room/cold store, office/administration building, toilet block/earth closet/water closet, loading bay/dock, factory building, engine/generator shed/room / power supply, machinery/plant/equipment – manufacturing/processing

Nanango Butter Factory Building is a heritage-listed factory at George Street, Nanango, South Burnett Region, Queensland, Australia. It was built in 1927. It was added to the Queensland Heritage Register on 3 June 2005.

== History ==
The Nanango Butter Factory, bounded by George Street and Sandy Creek, Nanango, is closely linked to the development of the Nanango district, as well as the rise and fall of the dairy industry in Queensland. The original factory, made of timber, was built in 1905. The current factory, of concrete and brick construction, was erected in 1927, extended to the north in 1953, and retains a number of its outbuildings and structures. These include loading bays, concrete tanks, sheds, and an office building.

The South Burnett district was first settled by Europeans in the early 1840s, as pastoralists worked their way north from the Darling Downs. By 1842 the sheep station Taromeo had been established by Simon Scott. Two other sheep stations were established shortly thereafter: Nanango, by William Elliot Oliver, and Tarong, by John Borthwick. Taromeo, Nanango and Tarong had all switched to beef cattle by the 1880s. Oliver's Head Station was at a creek two miles west of the site of the town of Nanango. The latter grew around an inn established by Jacob Goode in 1848, after he was allowed to camp near a waterhole on Nanango Station. The tracks from the Darling Downs and Brisbane converged at Goode's Inn on their way to Gayndah.

Nanango is one of Queensland's oldest towns. A post office was established at Goode's Inn in 1850, and in 1857 Nanango was gazetted for Courts of Petty Session, with a Courthouse being built in 1859. In 1861 the town of Nanango was surveyed, and the first sale of town blocks occurred in 1862, between today's Henry, Appin, George and Alfred Streets. James Nash found gold seven miles southeast of Inn in 1866, and the "Seven Mile Diggings" helped to increase the population of the area. Closer settlement began after an 1875 petition, and in 1876 regulations were for drawn up for monthly land courts, the first of which occurred in Nanango in 1877. In 1879 the Barambah Divisional Board was formed, and its office was built in Nanango in 1883. The 1884 Agricultural Lands Purchase Act aided in the resumption of part of Nanango Station for selection by farmers, who produced wheat and butter for the local market. Timber getting was also an industry in the area.

Initially, local farmers kept a few cows for domestic purposes, and town dwellers paid a fee to have a house cow that could be grazed on the town common. The first commercial dairy farm was started near Nanango in 1865, but this was a small operation that had to cart its cream overland to Gympie. By the 1890s events were occurring that would lead to the rapid growth of commercial dairy farming around Nanango, such as the advent of mechanical cream separators in Australia in the 1880s; the Babcock butterfat test; government grading of butter; and the advent of refrigerated shipping from Brisbane in 1884. In the late 1880s and early 1890s the Queensland Department of Agriculture and Stock used a Travelling Dairy to demonstrate techniques and equipment to potential dairy farmers. The 1893 Meat and Dairy Produce Act, which established subsidies for dairy farmers, and the 1894 Agricultural Lands Purchase Act also aided commercial dairying. Between 1894 and 1919 a large amount of land was repurchased by the Queensland Government from pastoralists, was and offered as agricultural selections. Closer settlement legislation between 1906 and 1917 also played its part in creating small agricultural service towns, as did the spread of Queensland's railway network. In 1890 there were 3,500 kilometres (2,200 mi) of rail-line in Queensland. By 1910 there was 6,300 kilometres (3,900 mi) and by 1920, 9,300 kilometres (5,800 mi). Between 1910 and 1920, most of the lines built were branch lines for agriculture.

The Co-operative movement, where producers held shares in the enterprises that processed and sold their product, had been developed in Switzerland during the 1880s, and was transferred from Victoria to Queensland by dairy immigrants during the 1890s and the first decade of the twentieth century. In 1900 the South Burnett carried 3,000 acres (1,200 ha) of crops, 7000 sheep, and 84,000 cattle. Dairying became a mainstay of the Nanango district between 1900 and 1914, the period of the industry's most rapid development.

In 1903, the year that the Shire of Nanango was formed, the railway line reached Wondai. In December of that year a thrice-weekly cream van run from Kunioon to the railhead was organised by Mr William Selby. Four farmers from Booie had begun carting their cream to Wondai earlier that year. From Wondai, the cream travelled by train to Gympie. In 1904 meetings were called at Nanango to consider a Co-operative butter factory, and in July 1904 the Nanango Co-operative Dairy Company was formed. The company was floated in February 1905, and in October a tender to build the factory was allocated to Waugh and Josephson. A single story timber factory was built in late 1905 for £820 (a second story was later added in September 1907). Machinery and plant cost a further £929. The first Annual General Meeting of the Co-operative was held in February 1906, and 1565 shares were allotted to 152 shareholders, 115 of those being fully paid up.

Butter manufacture commenced in April 1906, and by November the factory was also supplying ice. By 1906 the railway was moving closer to Nanango, and the first consignment of three tonnes of butter was dispatched from the Kingaroy railhead (1904). Nanango butter soon developed a reputation for excellence; in June 1906 the factory's product won first prize at the Maryborough show. Catalysts for dairying occurring around this time included the 1904 and 1905 Dairy Produce Acts; a cream testing certificate for officers in butter factories, introduced in 1906; and the 1906 Closer settlement Act. By 1910 there were 100 suppliers for the Nanango factory, which produced 197,889 pounds (89,761 kg) of butter. In 1911 the railway reached Nanango from the north, and in 1913 it reached Yarraman from the south.

On 25 October 1918, a fire started by lightning destroyed the factory, which was re-opened on 15 December 1919. By 1920, there were 5,000 sheep in the South Burnett compared to 230,000 beef and dairy cattle, with 10,000 pigs and 42,000 acres (17,000 ha) of crops. The Cactoblastis cactorum insect was introduced in 1923, and its defeat of the prickly pear enabled the Queensland dairy industry to rebuild and expand during the late 1920s, leading to the 1930s dairy boom. Also during the 1920s Butter and Cheese Boards were formed to equalise market prices, and the Nanango Co-operative Dairy Company became the Nanango Co-operative Dairy Association in 1924. By 1925 there were 320 suppliers to the factory.

On 13 October 1926 the factory burned once more, shortly after an equipment upgrade, and it was re-built in concrete at a cost of about £15,800. The Minister for Works, Michael J. Kirwan, officially opened the factory on 21 October 1927. In October 1929 a Mr W.G. Counsel of the Electric Supply Works, Warwick, recommended that the butter factory supply electricity to the town, using its engine to power a generator. Electricity was supplied from the factory to the Nanango Shire Council between March 1933 and March 1948.

By the 1930s, dairying was the most widely spread agricultural industry in Queensland, and it was the state's second most profitable export industry from 1936 to 1941. In 1938 there were five co-operative butter factories in the South Burnett: Nanango (since 1906), Kingaroy Butter Factory (1907), South Burnett Co-operative Dairy Association Factory (Murgon, 1911), Wondai (1931), and Proston (1935). In 1940 the factory at Nanango peaked at 483 suppliers. A cheese factory was established during World War II to feed the troops, but it only operated between January 1942 and November 1943. The building still stands to the north of the butter factory. In the 1947–48 financial year 2,806,881 pounds (1,273,180 kg) of butter was produced at the Nanango factory, and in 1948 the Nanango Dairy Co-operative Trading Society as created as a subsidiary of the Nanango Co-operative Dairy Association.

By 1950 the South Burnett was carrying 650 sheep, 130,000 dairy cows (ten percent of the Queensland total), 110,000 beef cattle, 70,000 pigs, and 160,000 acres (65,000 ha) of crops. However, as demand and prices for butter dropped in the 1950s, the decline of dairying accelerated. In 1953 the Nanango butter factory started producing butter milk powder, and a brick annex was added to the northern end of the factory to house the roller-drying plant. Butter consumption per capita in Australia dropped from 12.2 kilograms (27 lb) to 8.3 kilograms (18 lb) between 1957 and 1972, and Britain joining the European Economic Community provided another blow to prices. Irregular seasonal conditions and a lack of profits led many dairy farmers to drop out of the industry, and by 1975 the factory had 66 suppliers left. 1977 witnessed the end of the butter and cheese price equalisation scheme, and in May of that year butter production ended at Nanango. The factory continued to act as a depot for bulk milk tanker collections, which had begun in 1972. When the Nanango Dairy Co-operative Association closed the factory in 1986 only 37 milk suppliers remained.

The railway line that used to run alongside the western side of the factory has disappeared, as has a large water cooler that stood to the northeast of the factory. A 1929 Ruston Hornsby Model 9XHC 132 horsepower diesel engine, with a seven-foot flywheel, and a 1935 Ruston Hornsby Model VER 220 horsepower diesel of 18 metric tons (18 long tons; 20 short tons), remained on site until June 2004. These engines would have been used to run the factory's machinery, as well as to generate electricity for Nanango. A gas fitting business currently occupies the northern extension of the main factory building, and a plumber uses the southern end. To the south of the factory the old office building, of late 1920s construction, is now a residence/home business.

== Description ==
The main factory building is two stories high, rectangular, and runs parallel to George Street, on a north–south axis. It is constructed of concrete, with a brick extension to the north, and has fibrous cement sheeting and battens on the upper levels to the north and south. It has a gabled roof of galvanised iron with skylights, and a clerestory runs along the apex of the southern part of the roof. The western side of the building facing George Street has been stuccoed. There are four doors, a high-set roller door, and two hatches on the western side of the factory, five roller doors on the south side, and a roller door on the north side. There is a high-set loading bay with roller door on the southern end of the east side, and a concrete loading dock juts out between this and the engine room to the north. Windows are generally steel-framed with wire-covered panes, or consist of panelled glass louvres.

Internally the factory is divided into two main sections with concrete floors, and the smaller northern end currently contains an office facing George Street, with a larger open section behind. The southern end has a small office on a raised section facing George Street, and a large open area behind this, with a coldroom and storeroom on the George Street side, north of the office. A door on the east side of the southern section leads from the main space through to the engine room.

On the east side of the factory is an attached single-story engine room, with gabled roof of galvanised iron, constructed of rendered brick, with metal strapping set into the render. Steel loops are welded to the strapping at intervals. The engine room has a smaller northern section, with a roller door exiting the north side, and a double steel door exits the southern section to the east. The engine room has a concrete floor, and contains the concrete mounting pads of removed equipment, and one small engine. A hole has recently been cut into the floor of the engine room, near the largest concrete mounting.

South of the factory, across a large concrete pad, is the old office building of the Nanango Dairy Co-operative Association. It faces George Street, and is constructed of brick with a concrete and stucco frontage. To the east of the concrete pad are two open sheds of steel and timber construction, and an enclosed timber shed. To the east of the factory and engine room are a number of other structures. Running south to north these include: a small overgrown shed, related to the factory's cooling system; a rectangular semi-underground covered concrete tank; a brick toilet block; two underground concrete tanks next to the engine room; a small open-topped semi-underground concrete water tank; and an open two-storied twin-gabled loading bay, constructed of steel and timber and clad in galvanised iron. It has raised vents at each apex, clad in curved galvanised iron sheeting.

== Heritage listing ==
Nanango Butter Factory Building was listed on the Queensland Heritage Register on 3 June 2005 having satisfied the following criteria.

The place is important in demonstrating the evolution or pattern of Queensland's history.

The 1927 Nanango butter factory, built on a site that was used for butter production from 1906 to 1977, is evidence of the growth and decline of the dairy industry within the Nanango Shire, and within Queensland.

The place demonstrates rare, uncommon or endangered aspects of Queensland's cultural heritage.

The decline in the Queensland dairy industry in the 1960s and 1970s, and the resulting closure of small town butter factories, means that ex-butter factories that are relatively intact are now becoming uncommon.

The place is important in demonstrating the principal characteristics of a particular class of cultural places.

The layout of the factory, with its large internal space, loading bays, cold room, engine room, exterior water tanks, office building and other secondary structures demonstrates the principle characteristics of an early twentieth century butter factory.
