= Kingston Butter Factory =

Community arts centre in Kingston, Queensland, Australia

Coordinates: 27°39′29″S 153°07′14″E

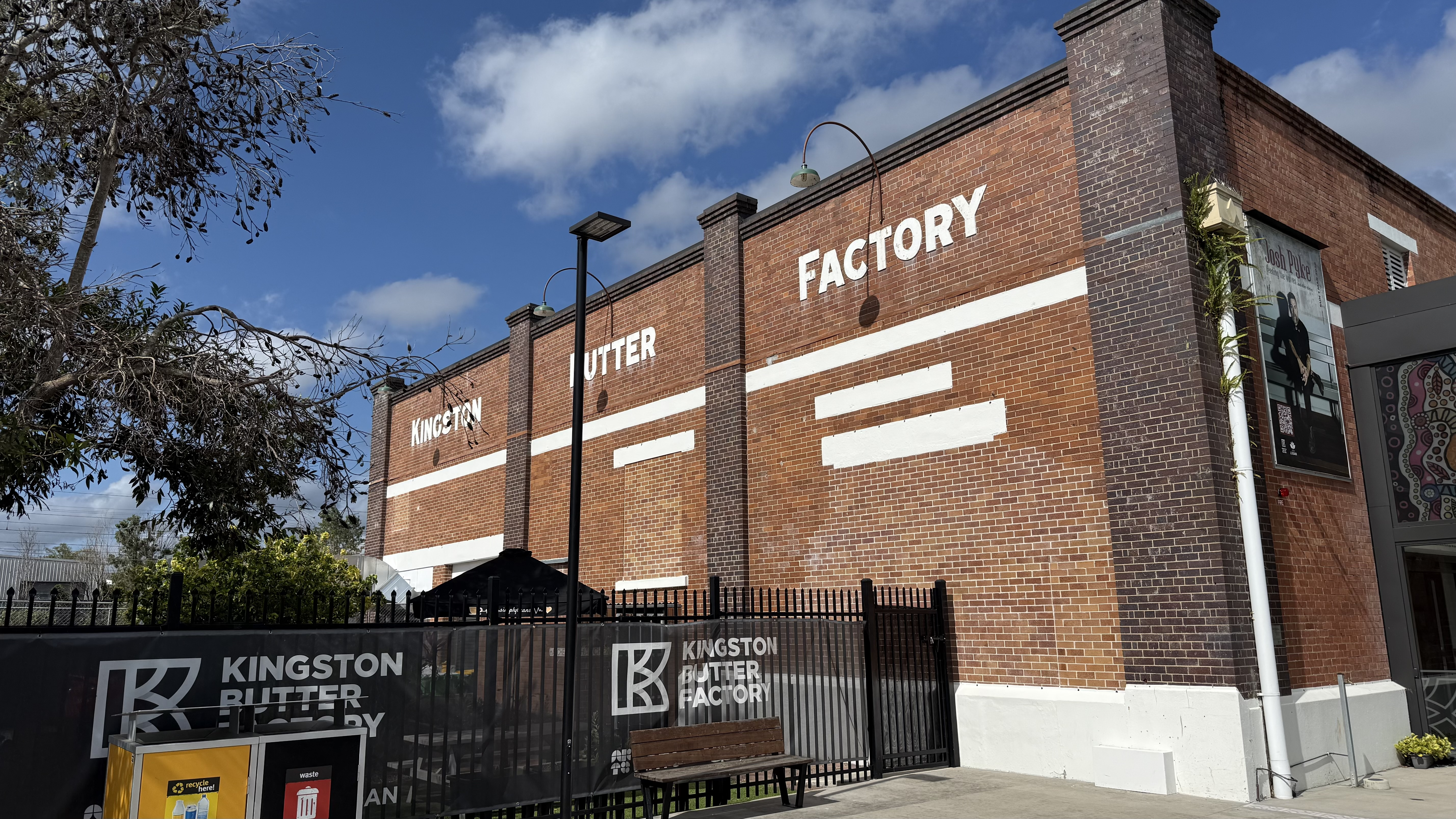
The Kingston Butter Factory in November 2025

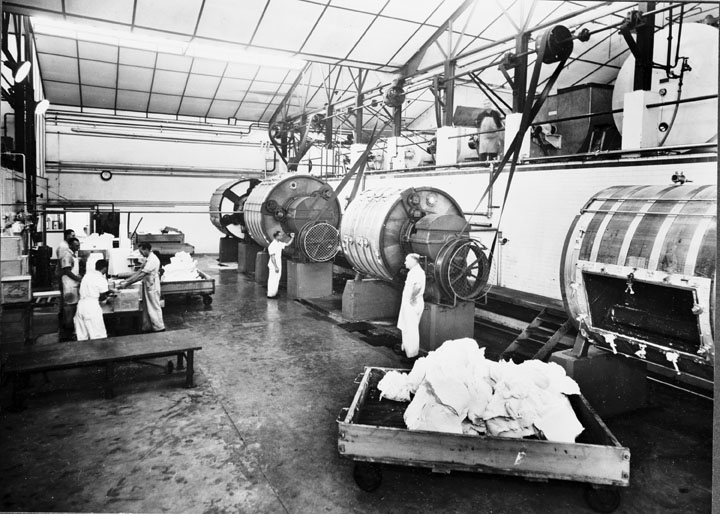
Dairy machinery at Kingston Butter Factory

The Kingston Butter Factory is a community arts centre in Kingston, Queensland, Australia. It is located adjacent to the Kingston railway station. The factory underpinned the local dairying industry for six decades.

It forms the main building in the Kingston Butter Factory Cultural Precinct, and after refurbishment, re-opened in July 2022.

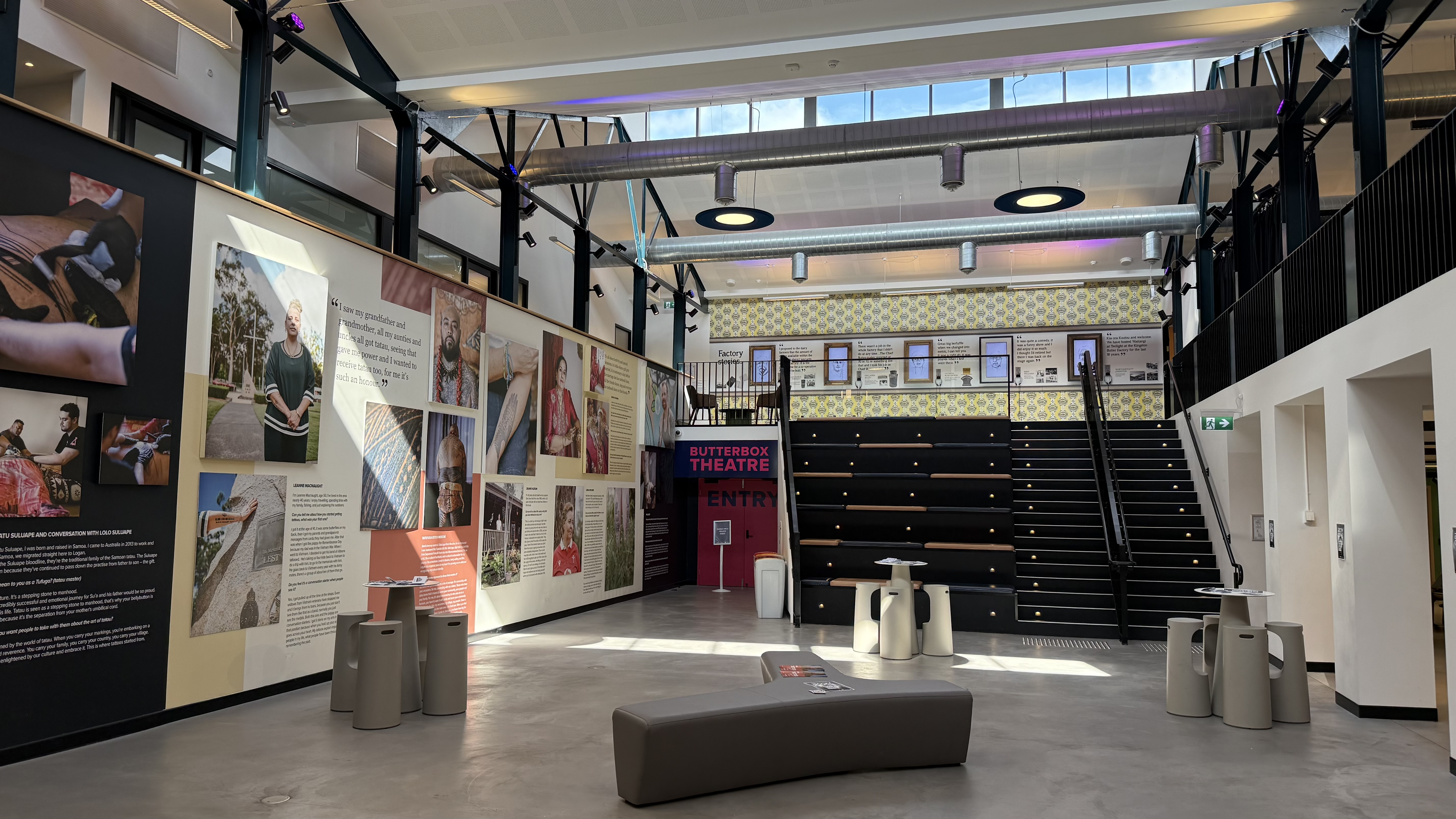
Inside the Kingston Butter Factory's public area, including the living museum and the entrance to the Butterbox Theatre

== History ==
The original building was first constructed in 1907. Construction was undertaken by Waugh and Josephson. The factory also made milk, cottage cheese, and baker's cheese. Until the late 1950s, the factory was operated as a co-operative. The factory was patronized by the Australian businessmen and politician William Stephens.

Original plans for a manufacturing plant in the area emerged in 1900. The goal was to export products to Europe. In 1906, a public meeting at Beenleigh Shire Hall saw around 50 dairy farmers gather. A ballot was held and a site near the railway with a good water supply was selected. In 1911, a railway siding for the factory was built. A modern brick building was built atop the old wooden structure in 1932.

The weekly output of butter was between 40 and 50 tonnes by 1930. Peak production was reached in 1934. In July 1950, the Kingston Butter Factory registered as a wholesale milk vendor.

The factory was closed in 1983. After funding by Logan City Council in 1998 it was transformed into a community arts centre. It was formerly home to a theatre company.

== Cultural Precinct ==
After refurbishment, the Kingston Butter Factory reopened in July 2022 as the centrepiece of The Kingston Butter Factory Cultural Precinct. Other parts of the precinct include an open-air stage launched in March 2022, a café in a restored workers' cottage, and the Logan City Historical Museum. The precinct can accommodate crowds of up to 5,000 people.

The Kingston Butter Factory includes the Butterbox Theatre, a versatile black-box style performance space.

== See also ==
- Boonah Butter Factory
