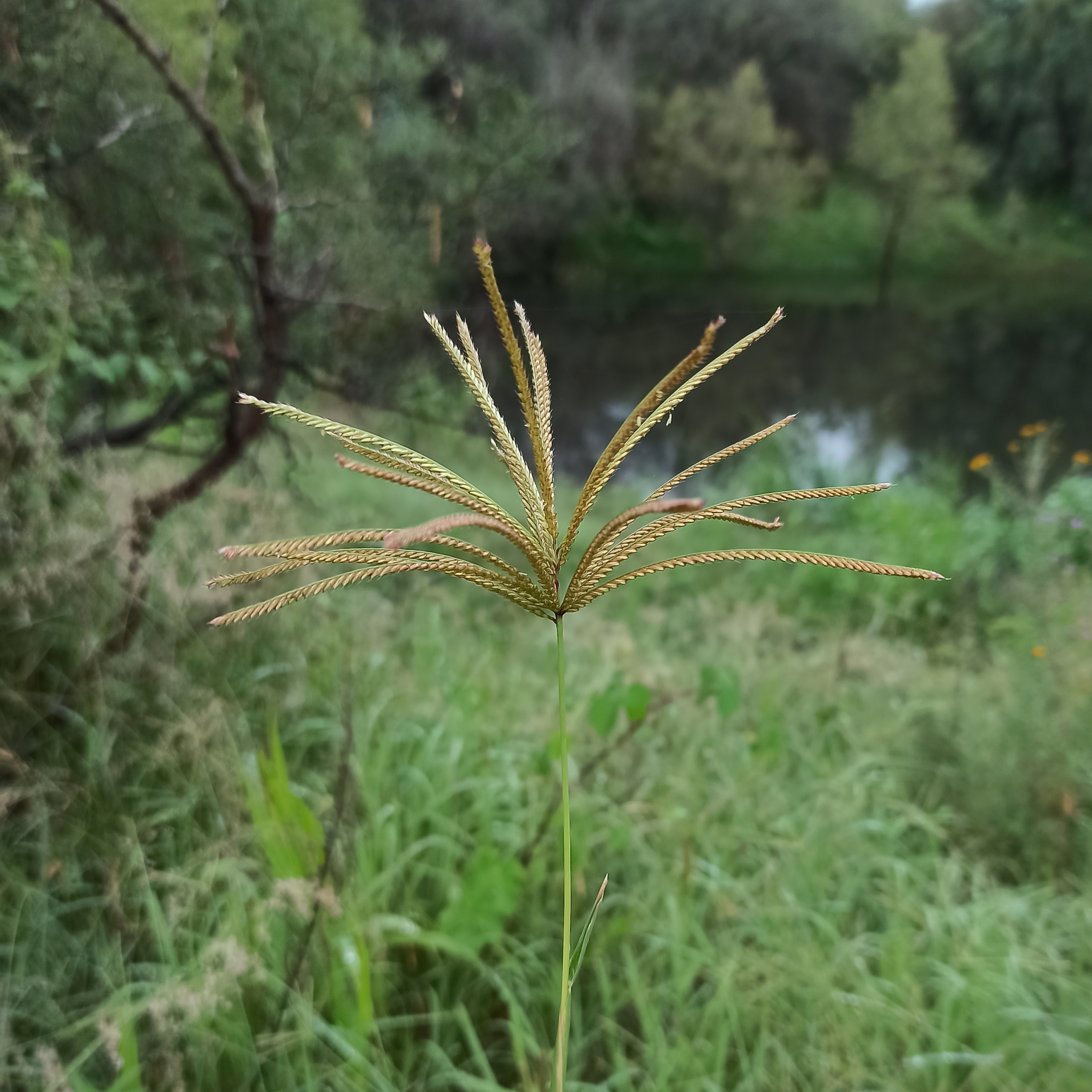

Scientific classification
- Kingdom: Plantae
- Clade: Tracheophytes
- Clade: Angiosperms
- Clade: Monocots
- Clade: Commelinids
- Order: Poales
- Family: Poaceae
- Subfamily: Chloridoideae
- Genus: Chloris
- Species: C. gayana

Binomial name
- Chloris gayana Kunth

= Chloris gayana =

Species of grass

Chloris gayana is a species of grass known by the common name Rhodes grass. It is native to Africa but it can be found throughout the tropical and subtropical world as a naturalized species.

It can grow in many types of habitat. It is also cultivated in some areas as a palatable graze for animals and a groundcover to reduce erosion and quickly revegetate denuded soil. It is tolerant of moderately saline and alkaline soils and irrigation.

== Description ==
This is a perennial grass which can reach one half to nearly three meters in height and spreads via stolons. It forms tufts and can spread into wide monotypic stands. The inflorescence is a single or double whorl of fingerlike racemes up to 15 centimeters long. Each spikelet in the raceme is a few millimeters long and contains one or two fertile florets and up to four sterile florets.

== Growing conditions ==
Its seasonal growth is in the spring and summer and its rainfall requirement is 600–750 mm per year. This low rainfall requirement means that this grass can survive in drier places. Rhodes grass can grow in a variety of soil conditions. Its ideal soil would be anything greater than a 4.3 pH level in terms of acidity. In addition to this, Chloris gayana has a moderate aluminum tolerance. The fact that this type of grass survives on little rainfall, can grow in low pH soils, and has a moderate tolerance to aluminum means that it may be beneficial to poor farmers in the sub-tropics. Less work is required to maintain this grass which means that the farmers can focus on other priorities. It is also beneficial to farmers who own land with poor soil.

Benefits from Chloris gayana can also be found in the plant's growth. The seed germinates quickly (1–7 days) depending on temperature. and it often achieves full ground cover within three months of sowing. This too is good for farmers when it comes to covering bare soil. The fact that Chloris gayana can grow quickly means that farmers could use it to protect the soil from eroding.

== Stress tolerance ==
An important feature of Chloris gayana is its drought tolerance. The reason why it is drought tolerant can be found in its roots. Production may effect with mild drought period if it is cultivated for forage purpose. Chloris gayana roots are able to extract water at a depth of 4.25 meters. Since this grass has good drought tolerance, it could also be beneficial to farmers for ensuring livestock are fed in times of drought.

Another important feature of Chloris gayana can be found in its salt tolerance. In terms of grass species, this type appears to be one of "the most salt-tolerant species" in terms of grasses. In "saline conditions, plant growth is restricted". Since Chloris gayana shows good salt tolerance, this type of grass can be beneficial to farmers who have salinity problems in their soil.

== Genetic stocks ==
There are various genetic varieties of Chloris gayana that exist like Katambora, Pioneer and Callide. "Katambora" is an important genetic variety that originates from Zimbabwe. It has been found to be more persistent on poorer soil than other genetic varieties. Katambora is meant for hay production because it is leafier, finer-stemmed, and produces better dry matter. "Katambora" is diploid type. Diploid types of Chloris gayana in general show good frost tolerance, salt tolerance, and drought tolerance.

A different type of Chloris gayana are tetraploid types. Tetraploid types of Chloris gayana have a major characteristic in which they flower late in the season which means the feed quality is maintained longer It has also been determined that tetraploid varieties of Chloris gayana have "higher concentrations of nutrients". Both tetraploid and diploid varieties at the pre-flowering stage of growth have "adequate concentrations of nutrients". Understanding the different genetic varieties of Chloris gayana is beneficial to farmers. Knowing the different types will allow a farmer to choose what is best for their situation.

== Practical information ==
Chloris gayana can be very helpful to farmers and NGOs in terms of sustainable agricultural development. Pasture establishment for farmers "demand high capital cost and labour." A possible solution to this would be to intercrop Chloris gayana with food crops. This would be economically feasible for resource poor farmers. Chloris gayana can be undersown to maize after final weeding of the crop without affecting maize grain yield. In addition to this, "growing cultivated forages, in association with food crops, can contribute to the improvement of the qualitative and quantitative supply of livestock feed." Intercropping Chloris gayana with a food crop is a practical method farmers can use when it comes to sustainable agricultural development.

There are some practical tips that farmers should be aware of when it comes to harvesting Chloris gayana. For example, "the crop is most productive in the first two or three cuts". The nutritive value of this forage is high when the grass is young, but it decreases with maturity. Farmers should be aware of this in order to make sure that they can take full advantage of this type of grass. In terms of grazing, Chloris gayana should be grazed when the weather is not appropriate for harvesting. This too is important for being able to use this type of grass efficiently.

There are other practical uses that farmers can benefit from when growing Chloris gayana. It can help with weed control because it can outcompete and smother weeds. In addition to this, Chloris gayana is also able to deal with soil erosion on sloped fields by holding topsoil. Chloris gayana can also be mixed with legumes such as cowpea, stylo, and alfalfa which also improves soil nutrient levels. Managing weeds, soil erosion, and improving the soil are all important issues a farmer must deal with. Chloris gayana can be a good option for a farmer when it comes to trying to solve these problems.
