= Kingaroy Butter Factory =

Building in Queensland, Australia

- Location within Queensland Location within Australia
- 26.5325°S 151.8346°E
- Location: 67 William Street, Kingaroy, South Burnett Region, Queensland, Australia

History
- Design period: 1919–1930s (interwar period)
- Built: 1926

Site notes
- Architect: Waugh and Josephson

Queensland Heritage Register
- Official name: Kingaroy Butter Factory (former)
- Type: state heritage (built)
- Designated: 9 November 2012
- Reference no.: 602809
- Significant period: Inter-war
- Significant components: shed/s, factory building, cold room/cold store, docking/loading facility

Kingaroy Butter Factory is a heritage-listed former butter factory at 67 William Street, Kingaroy, South Burnett Region, Queensland, Australia. It was designed by Waugh and Josephson and built in 1926. It was added to the Queensland Heritage Register on 9 November 2012.

== History ==
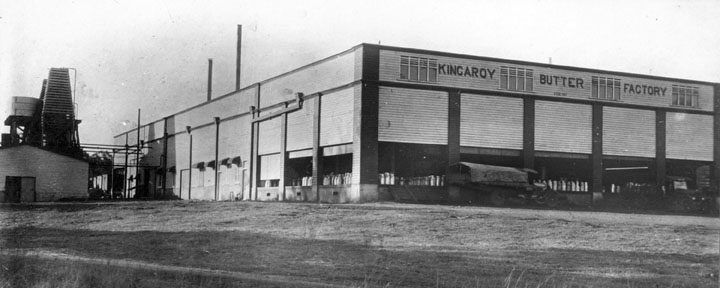
Kingaroy Butter Factory, 1929

The Kingaroy Butter Factory, a large timber clad building located in William Street, Kingaroy was built by contractors Waugh and Josephson in 1926, replacing an earlier factory established in 1907, on behalf of the Maryborough Co-operative Dairy Company.

From the late 1800s, a number of critical factors enabled the expansion of the dairy industry into one of Queensland's principal primary industries by the interwar period. These included: government resumption and repurchase of land from pastoralists for the purpose of agricultural selection; the introduction of mechanical cream separators in the 1880s; Babcock testing to accurately measure cream content in milk; The Meat and Dairy Encouragement Act 1893 which made provision for government loans to construct butter and cheese factories; and the Department of Agriculture and Stock's use of a "Travelling Dairy" to demonstrate techniques and equipment to potential dairy farmers throughout Queensland. This period also saw the introduction of sown pastures such as paspalum and Rhodes grass and the cultivation of fodder, to improve milk yields and to provide adequate feed during the less productive months of winter.

Effective transport infrastructure was essential for dairy products to reach their desired markets. The extension of Queensland's rural railway network enabled more efficient transportation of dairy produce, facilitating the establishment of local butter and cheese factories in close proximity to railway lines. The first shipment of butter to Britain occurred in 1895 and from 1903 government subsidisation of a fortnightly shipping service to the United Kingdom improved Queensland's butter exporting capabilities.

The arrival of the Kilkivan branch railway to the "56 mile peg" in 1904 was the impetus for the establishment of the township of Kingaroy and a catalyst for the rapid expansion of dairying in the surrounding district, then an emerging but relatively small scale industry in the South Burnett. Within two years of opening, Kingaroy railway station was sending 10 long tons (10 t) of cream weekly to Maryborough, while some farmers were also sending cream to Nanango.

By the early 1900s, co-operatives, where groups of local producers banded together to establish factories, were becoming the dominant form of ownership of cheese and butter factories, a pattern that defined the Queensland dairy industry for much of the 20th century. The Maryborough Co-operative Dairy Company (MCDC) was producing butter and ice at its Maryborough factory from February 1901, with the decision to form a co-operative made in 1898. During 1905, a group of local Kingaroy dairy farmers met with directors of the MCDC and lobbied for the establishment of a branch factory at Kingaroy. The directors of the company entered into agreement to build a factory in early 1906, with 1525 shares in the company allocated to dairy farmers and other shareholders from the Kingaroy district. Company representatives selected a site in June of that year along the railway line on the northern outskirts of Kingaroy. The owner of the property, Tom Reen, donated one acre for the factory site, with the company purchasing another nineteen acres at £10 per acre. By October construction had begun on the building, a railway siding and a 12,000 imperial gallons (55,000 L; 14,000 US gal) well, with the factory producing butter by March 1907.

The Kingaroy Butter Factory soon became an essential component of MCDC's operations, reflecting the suitability and productivity of the South Burnett district for dairying. The 1913 half yearly report of the MCDC noted 465,887 pounds (211,323 kg) (211,766.8 kilograms (466,866 lb)) of butter had been produced at Kingaroy in the first half of the year, almost twice as much as at Maryborough and nearly 100,000 pounds (45,000 kg) more than at Biggenden (built by the MCDC in 1911). The MCDC also opened factories in Mundubbera (1916) and Wondai (1931). Throughout its history, the Kingaroy Butter Factory was the largest producer of the MCDC's five factories. By 1929, the Wide Bay district, in which the South Burnett was included, was second only to the Moreton district in Queensland milk production.

In May 1925 the directors of the MCDC visited Kingaroy to announce plans to construct a new factory building with modern machinery. At an estimated cost of £18,000-£20,000, sourced from butter profits, local shareholders expressed their dissatisfaction with this arrangement, as the decision had been made without their consultation. The company directors argued that the new factory would increase productivity and increase returns to suppliers. While some shareholders voiced intentions of separating from the company prior to, and following the announcement of the new factory, this ultimately did not occur and the building proceeded.

The building was constructed by Brisbane contractors Waugh and Josephson, with the final cost of £47,000 more than doubling the original estimate. The construction of the building was not put out to tender and a later inquiry into secret commissions in the dairy industry implicated former Maryborough Co-operative Dairy Company Director WA Shultz in receiving payments from Waugh and Josephson for the award of the contract.

The new factory was officially opened 7 October 1926 by William Forgan Smith, Minister for Agriculture and Stock. The factory was opened for inspection and a marquee was erected on the factory grounds, with a large crowd in attendance.

The building of the new Kingaroy factory occurred during a period of modernisation for butter manufacturers. By the end of the 1920s, most Queensland butter factories had been remodelled or were new buildings of brick and concrete, replacing earlier timber structures. The emphasis on producing high grade butter saw the need for more churns within factories to maintain outputs, as the lower temperatures required meant churns were turning longer than previously. In addition to upgrading buildings and equipment, greater attention was paid to ensuring butter was of a high standard, through stricter grading and by employing processes of pasteurisation and neutralisation. Increasing numbers of trained staff were working in factories.

The manufacture of butter followed a fairly typical process at factories throughout Queensland. Once cream cans were received at a loading dock and weighed, the cream was tested to determine its grading (choice, 2nd or 3rd), before the cans were emptied into vats and cleaned for return to the supplier. The cream was then pasteurised, cooled and pumped to storage vats, before being sent to the churns. The resulting butter was refrigerated, parcelled into butter boxes and forwarded by rail for export or distribution into local markets.

In order to preserve butter during storage and transportation, the production of ice was a necessary component of operations. This process occurred at Kingaroy in a small timber building adjacent to the main building. In addition to the factory's needs, ice was also sold for other commercial and domestic uses.

In the years following the construction of the new factory, butter production increased markedly, from 50 long tons (51 t) per week during 1926–1927, to 98 long tons (100 t) per week during 1928–1929. The factory reached its peak weekly production of 99 long tons (101 t) and 12cwt during 1929–1930, then a record for Queensland butter production. In 1931, it was Queensland's largest butter factory in terms of production, a time when close to 1000 suppliers were selling cream to the factory. In 1932–33, Kingaroy exported a higher average grade of butter than any other Queensland factory. Throughout the 1930s, the factory won numerous awards in Australia and England for the quality of its butter. During 1938–9, a record year, almost a third of all Queensland's butter was produced in the Wide Bay-Burnett, with Kingaroy the fifth largest producer in the state.

In the 1930s Kingaroy Shire had a burgeoning peanut industry and was a well established centre for maize production, but it was dairying that was the principal primary industry. As a measure of the industry's growth, the payment to Kingaroy factory suppliers in its first full financial year was £5723. By 1934 this had grown to £157,785. At the end of 1933, cream suppliers to the factory were being paid eight pence per pound for first grade cream, seven pence for second grade.

The interwar period saw the dairy industry expand greatly in Queensland. Between 1927 and 1937 the total number of dairy cattle rose by 50%. By the 1930s, dairying was Queensland's most widely spread agricultural industry and the state's second most profitable export industry from 1936 to 1941, accounting for 20% of primary production. By the late 1930s, around one in eight Queenslanders were living on dairy farms. In 1938 there were five co-operative butter factories in the South Burnett: located at Nanango, Kingaroy, Murgon, Wondai and Proston. While butter factories enabled the production and export of dairy products, numerous small farms reliant on family labour to milk herds twice daily for generally modest returns, were the backbone of the industry.

During World War II, butter factories throughout Queensland were engaged in the production of cheese. The Kingaroy, Nanango and Murgon factories all produced cheese during this period. Varying sources give the commencement date for production of cheese at Kingaroy as 1941 or 1942, ending in 1946. Between March 1942 and November 1944, 1.135 million pounds of cheese was produced. An annexe was built to the rear of the main building, containing two rooms; the larger for production and the lesser for maturation and storage, with walls lined with hoop pine timber, infilled with sawdust for temperature control. After cheese production ceased the annexe was used to produce buttermilk powder.

By 1950 the farms of the South Burnett were stocked with 130,000 dairy cows, ten percent of the Queensland total. The Kingaroy Butter Factory maintained an average production of 75 long tons (76 t) of butter per week until the early 1950s. Factory improvements in this period included the purchase of a new butter wrapping machine for £2000 in 1950, and the installation of stainless steel equipment for treating cream in 1956. Such improvements, however, were not enough to protect the factory from the beginnings of a wider decline of Queensland's dairy industry, as demand and prices for butter began to drop. The downturn worsened in the 1960s, with a reduction in cream suppliers diminishing output. The transition towards the production of milk rather than cream, requiring larger herds and new equipment, saw many smaller scale farmers leaving the industry. In Kingaroy Shire cream suppliers fell dramatically, from 265 in 1965 to 155 in 1969. Correspondingly, between 1960 and 1968 the number of dairy cows in the Shire fell from 23,885 to 12,225. Export opportunities also became restricted, culminating with the end of preferential trade agreements with Britain following its entry into the European Common Market in 1973.

The late 1960s saw the beginning of closures of butter factories in the Burnett region. The Proston Butter Factory, a branch of the South Burnett Dairy Co., closed in 1967. The Maryborough Co-operative Dairy Company closed their branch factories at Wondai and Biggenden in February 1969. By 1976 dairy farmers in the South Burnett numbered under 400 and of these, 211 were bulk milk suppliers. The average age of a dairyman was 55 and two dairy producers were leaving the industry per week.

While Kingaroy's supply benefited in the short term from Wondai's closure, ultimately it was not enough to sustain the business. In May 1977 it was announced that both Nanango and the Kingaroy butter factories would close and that all cream supplies would be diverted to Murgon. With a large number of suppliers leaving the industry, and manufacturing and other costs dramatically increasing, it was no longer economically viable for the factories to stay open. By the time of Kingaroy Butter Factory's closure, there were only 38 suppliers and only one and a half tonnes of butter produced a week, a far cry from its interwar heyday.

For a time after closing, the factory operated as a milk collection point for the Maryborough Co-operative Dairy Association. In 1989 the market milk operations and the factory was sold to Suncoast Milk, a subsidiary of Queensland United Foods. For a period during the 1980s a rear section of the building leased by Kidd's Cabinet Makers. From November 1986, Graham Helmhold began leasing the front of the building for the operations of his company Proteco, one of Australia's major cold pressed oil processors. Proteco purchased the property in 1995. This business has since changed ownership. From 2002 to 2009, dairy processing returned to the site, with Kingaroy Cheese using part of the main building for cheese making. This business has since relocated to Brisbane. A peanut roasting company now uses the space vacated by Kingaroy Cheese. The site is not open to the public. As of 2014, Proteco Oils has full ownership of the site and operates it offices, reception and factory outlet/sales of their oils from the old Manager's Building at the front of the site.

== Description ==
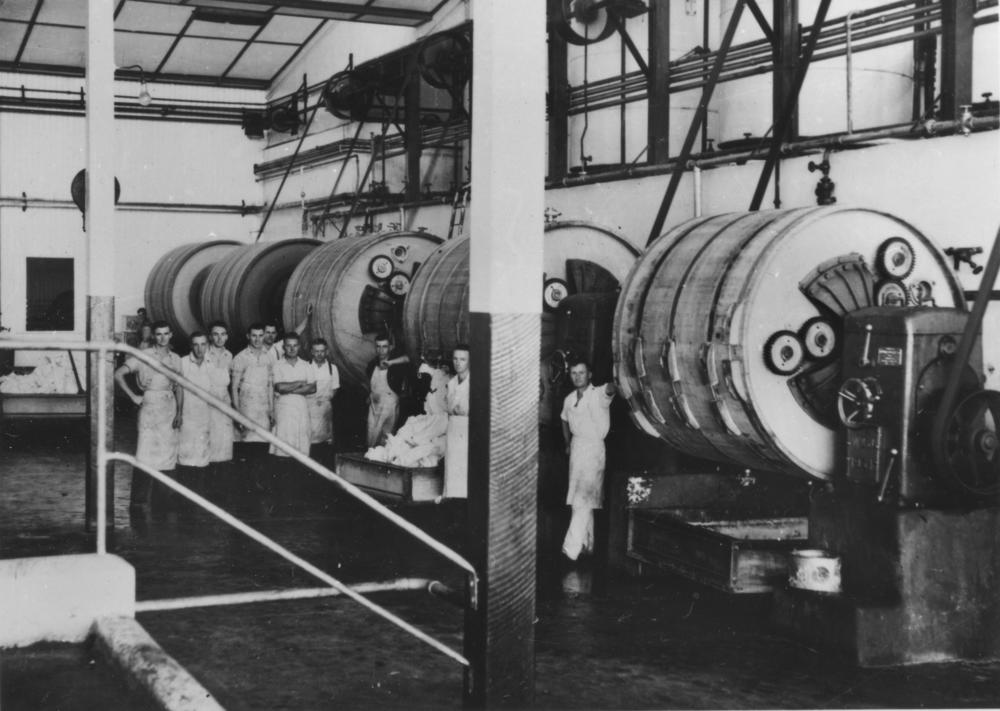
Workers inside the churn room, 1938

The former Kingaroy Butter Factory complex stands at the northern end of William Street, Kingaroy north west of the CBD of Kingaroy and adjacent to the formation of the Kilkivan/Kingaroy railway line. The complex comprises the main butter factory shed, 1940s cheese factory, ice works shed, former office, amenities and cold stores shed, modern cheese making facility and a number of other sheds and structures.

An early engine (maker's plate LG Terne Engineers of Glasgow) stands near the front gate and the entrance forecourt accommodates car parking. The site works off a road running centrally through the complex with an ancillary road to the west side. The roads and carpark are bitumened and concrete drains and edges run along the spine road.

The significant structures are the Main butter factory shed, 1940s cheese factory (east and west sheds), ice works shed and former office, which are described individually below.

=== Main butter factory shed ===
The main building is a rectangular timber framed and chamferboard clad building with a slab on ground concrete floor throughout. The timber frame stands on a low concrete upstand that runs around the perimeter of the shed. A moulded timber cornice runs around the parapet that screens the sawtooth roofs behind. The sawtooth roofs are clad with corrugated metal sheeting and have south facing clerestory windows; most are glazed, some house fixed timber louvres or are clad with corrugated metal sheeting. An additional narrow rectangular raised gable roof with glazed windows to the east and west sits over part of the centre of the shed.

The south, east and west elevations are notable for full height pilasters marking out bays which to the southern part of the building are punctuated by smaller pilasters which terminated in a lower cornice that is now removed. The smaller pilasters define the loading dock openings - three to the west, five to the south and six to the east. A continuous concrete ledge projects around the southern third of the building below the dock openings. Eleven original large timber braced-and-ledged vertical sliding doors remain to these openings providing access to the dock within. Rainwater heads and downpipes run down these elevations.

The south elevation is distinguished by four sets of timber framed upper windows with glazed and fixed timber louvres to the upper face. The west elevation is punctuated by a number of openings including timber framed casement windows to the mezzanine office. Reflecting the receipt/despatch activities of the factory processing, the east elevation accommodates a number of hatch openings at various points along the length of the building. A number are now boarded over. Hooded exhaust vents protrude along the northern end of the elevation. The blank north elevation is clad with horizontal chamferboards and metal sheeting.

The building accommodates substantially intact functional spaces reflecting the various stages in the handling and processing of milk products including engine, plant and machinery rooms, testing rooms, chill rooms, cold stores, salt room, packing rooms, cream platform, churn room, main room, receiving and despatch docks and a mezzanine office.

Throughout the main building linings generally are vertical or horizontal tongue and groove boarding or fibrous cement sheeting with cover strips. The roof is generally framed with timber trusses supported on corbelled timber posts.

The southern end accommodates the receiving and despatch docks, main room, cream platform, churn room, chill and cold rooms, salt room, packing rooms, testing rooms and the office mezzanine. Concrete platforms, approximately 700 millimetres (28 in) above the level of the main room, run along the east, south and west sides and form the receiving and despatch docks. These docks service the former railway siding to the east and vehicle loading area to the south and west. The deck of the cream platform is formed by the concrete ceilings of the chill and cold stores, salt room, packing and other rooms below. A fibrous cement sheeted partition runs part the way down the west side and stout timber posts continue around the perimeter. The posts to the west side carry large metal brackets that supported the pulleys and belts once associated with the motors for the churns which stood on the floor below. The main room now accommodates machinery and equipment for the current oil pressing business. The chill/cold stores, salt room and packing rooms retain original features including hatches, doors and doorways, concrete upstands and floor drains.

The office mezzanine, supported by the structure of the storage spaces below, is timber framed and partly screened by partitions clad with vertical tongue and groove boards. The ceiling to the southern end is lined with fibrous cement sheeting ceilings and accommodates lattice ventilation screens to the cream platform.

The northern end, formerly accommodating engine, plant and machinery areas, has exposed roof framing (some unpainted) and horizontal unpainted chamferboard linings to the interior walls. Some spaces are lined with insulation panels, have new fittings and there is new concrete screed to some floors. Some floors show evidence of tracks and plant and machinery fixings.

=== 1940s cheese factory ===
The 1940s cheese factory stands to the northern end of the site and consists of two sheds each clad with fibrous cement sheeting and sheltered by gabled roofs clad with corrugated metal sheeting. Three circular roof vents project from the west shed and two inverted tubular exhaust vents protrude from the east. The west shed and the southern third of the east shed have a painted perimeter concrete upstand, approximately 450 millimetres (18 in) high. Both sheds have fixed timber louvre vents to the north and south gable ends.

=== West cheese factory shed ===
Lettering, The Cheese Factory 1941–1946, is painted to the upper part of the south elevation of the west shed. A slab on ground concrete floor runs throughout with an elevated concrete dock to the south end. Sash windows punctuate the east, west and north sides and a horizontal sliding braced and ledged timber door opens from the south dock. Horizontal sliding metal doors open to the west and north. The interior has exposed painted timber roof trusses. The ceiling and upper walls are unlined and the lower walls are lined with fibrous cement sheeting with cover strips over the joins. A narrow band of wire mesh runs along the upper west and part of the east walls. Approximately mid-way along the east wall, a solid timber framed and lined door with a robust handle and latch provides access between the two sheds.

=== East cheese factory shed ===
This is the smaller of the two sheds, the southern third has a slab on ground floor and the rest of the shed stands on low timber stumps and is accessed by a recent ramp to the north side. The cavities in the walls are filled with sawdust for insulation. The east elevation is distinguished by three mid-height small square windows; and a low hooded hatch and a horizontal sliding metal door at the south end. The shed has a suspended timber floor and dark honey-coloured horizontal unpainted pine lining to the interior walls on which lighter shadows reveal the locations of vertical supports for the storage shelving that once lined the room. A solid timber framed and lined door with a robust handle provides access to the south end of the shed. A concrete drain runs along the east side of the shed.

=== Ice works shed ===
Standing to the middle of the site, the former ice works shed is a small rectangular structure with a painted perimeter concrete upstand, timber framed walls clad with chamferboards and is sheltered by a gable roof clad with corrugated metal sheeting. A timber door and a set of timber framed casement windows are accommodated to the west elevation, there are doorways to the middle of the east and south elevations and the shed butts against the new cheese making facility to the north. The interior has a concrete tank to the west and an elevated concrete dock to the east side. Equipment and machinery associated with the ice works remains in the shed including the ice block moulds.

=== Former office ===
A small square timber-framed building standing on low timber stumps, clad with timber weatherboards and fibrous cement sheeting and sheltered by a hipped tiled roof, the former office building stands to the south of the complex. Notable features include the front porch entrance and cantilevered timber framed window hoods.

== Heritage listing ==
The former Kingaroy Butter Factory was listed on the Queensland Heritage Register on 9 November 2012 having satisfied the following criteria.

The place is important in demonstrating the evolution or pattern of Queensland's history.

The former Kingaroy Butter Factory (1926) is important in demonstrating the growth of the dairy industry in the Wide Bay-Burnett, one of Queensland's most important dairy producing regions during the twentieth century. Replacing an earlier factory built in 1907, the Kingaroy Butter factory was among Queensland's largest and most awarded butter producers during the dairying boom of the interwar period.

The former Kingaroy Butter Factory illustrates the evolution of Queensland's dairy industry during the interwar period, when most butter factories were remodelled or rebuilt in response to a rapid expansion of cream production and the need to adopt modern manufacturing processes.

The cheese making annexe (1941) is important in demonstrating the accelerated programme of cheese production that occurred in Queensland during World War II.

The place is important in demonstrating the principal characteristics of a particular class of cultural places.

The former Kingaroy Butter Factory complex is important in demonstrating the principal characteristics and processes of a butter factory, a significant type of industrial activity in Queensland's history. The place is situated adjacent to a railway line, formerly served by a siding to enable transportation of its products. The intact internal arrangement of the main factory building incorporates a loading dock, storage platform, testing, churn, cold storage and packing areas, original mezzanine office and the provision of rear space for the factory's plant. Adjacent associated buildings, including the cheese annexe (1941), office (c. 1950) and ice manufacturing shed, illustrate activities interconnected with the production of butter on the site.
