= Bunya Mountains road network =

Group of roads that provide access to the Bunya Mountain community

Bunya Mountains road network is a group of roads that provide access to the mountain community from various lowland localities. The network ensures continuity of access in times of flooding or other natural disasters, and during planned maintenance activities. The locality of Bunya Mountains includes the Bunya Mountains National Park and the enclosed locality of Mowbullan. The area hosts a small residential community plus many tourism accommodation venues.

Located to the north-west of Toowoomba, north-east of Dalby and south-west of Kingaroy, in Queensland, Australia, Bunya Mountains is also a popular day-trip destination. Most traffic from north of Brisbane travels through Maidenwell, to the east of the mountain, or Kumbia, to the north, while most traffic from south and west of Brisbane approaches from the south.

== Roads in the network ==
In addition to the New England Highway, D'Aguilar Highway and Bunya Highway, the following roads are considered to be part of the network:

- Bunya Mountains–Maclagan Road
- Bunya Mountains Road
- Dalby–Cooyar Road
- Kingaroy–Cooyar Road
- Maidenwell–Bunya Mountains Road
- Nanango–Tarong Road

== Bunya Mountains–Maclagan Road ==
Bunya Mountains–Maclagan Road
- Location: Dalby–Cooyar Road, Maclagan to Bunya Mountains Road, Moola
- Length: 16.4 km (10.2 mi)

Bunya Mountains–Maclagan Road is a state-controlled district road (number 4163), part of which is rated as a local road of regional significance (LRRS). It carries traffic from Maclagan on the Dalby–Cooyar Road to Moola on the Bunya Mountains Road, a distance of 16.4 kilometres (10.2 mi). Together with Jondaryan–Nungil Road and Pechey–Maclagan Road it provides a fairly direct route from the Warrego Highway at Jondaryan to the Bunya Mountains. There is an unsealed section of 2 kilometres (1.2 mi) on this road.

== Bunya Mountains Road ==
Bunya Mountains Road
- Location: Dalby–Cooyar Road, Kaimkillenbun to Bunya Highway, Kumbia, via Bunya Mountains
- Length: 58.1 km (36.1 mi)

Bunya Mountains Road is a state-controlled district road (number 4161) rated as a local road of regional significance (LRRS). It runs from Kaimkillenbun on the Dalby–Cooyar Road to Bunya Mountains via Moola, and on to Kumbia on the Bunya Highway via Alice Creek, a circuitous route of 58.1 kilometres (36.1 mi). The southern climb/descent (from/to Moola) is steep and narrow with tight curves, while the northern climb/descent (from/to Alice Creek) is a less challenging road.

== Dalby–Cooyar Road ==
Dalby–Cooyar Road
- Location: Bunya Highway, Dalby to Oakey–Cooyar Road, Nutgrove
- Length: 58.0 km (36.0 mi)

Dalby–Cooyar Road runs from Dalby to Nutgrove, a distance of 58.0 kilometres (36.0 mi). It carries Bunya Mountains traffic from Dalby and other points on the Warrego Highway to either Kaimkillenbun or Maclagan, where roads to the Bunya Mountains originate.

== Kingaroy–Cooyar Road ==
Kingaroy–Cooyar Road
- Location: D'Aguilar Highway, Kingaroy to New England Highway, Cooyar, via Maidenwell
- Length: 52.0 km (32.3 mi)

Kingaroy–Cooyar Road is a state-controlled district road (number 419) rated as a local road of regional significance (LRRS). It runs from the D'Aguilar Highway in Kingaroy to the New England Highway in Cooyar, a distance of 52.0 kilometres (32.3 mi) by a circuitous route, passing through the localities of Taabinga, Goodger, Brooklands, Tarong, Maidenwell, Pimpimbudgee and Neumgna. It carries Bunya Mountains traffic primarily from the New England Highway to the Maidenwell–Bunya Mountains Road in Maidenwell.

== Maidenwell–Bunya Mountains Road ==
Maidenwell–Bunya Mountains Road
- Location: Kingaroy–Cooyar Road, Maidenwell to Bunya Mountains Road, Bunya Mountains
- Length: 25.5 km (15.8 mi)

Maidenwell–Bunya Mountains Road is a state-controlled district road (number 4196) rated as a local road of regional significance (LRRS). It runs from Kingaroy–Cooyar Road in Maidenwell to Bunya Mountains Road in Bunya Mountains, a distance of 25.5 kilometres (15.8 mi), passing through Wengenville. There is an unsealed section of about 2 kilometres (1.2 mi) on this road. The climb/descent is steep and narrow, but with no sharp curves.

== Nanango–Tarong Road ==
Nanango–Tarong Road
- Location: D'Aguilar Highway, Nanango to Kingaroy–Cooyar Road, Tarong
- Length: 15.6 km (9.7 mi)

Nanango–Tarong Road is a state-controlled district road (number 429) rated as a local road of regional significance (LRRS). It runs from the D'Aguilar Highway in Nanango to Kingaroy–Cooyar Road in Tarong, a distance of 15.6 kilometres (9.7 mi), passing through South Nanango. This road carries Bunya Mountains traffic from Nanango, including that arriving via the Burnett Highway, to Tarong. From there, the traffic follows the Kingaroy–Cooyar Road to Maidenwell, where it enters the Maidenwell–Bunya Mountains Road.
