= Barker Creek Flat =

- Suburb
- Interactive map of Barker Creek Flat
- Coordinates: 26.6455°S 151.9447°E
- Country: Australia
- State: Queensland
- LGA: South Burnett Region
- Location: 8.3 km (5.2 mi) WNW of Nanango; 20.8 km (12.9 mi) SE of Kingaroy; 142 km (88 mi) N of Toowoomba; 207 km (129 mi) NW of Brisbane

Government
  - State electorate: Nanango
  - Federal division: Maranoa

Area
  - Total: 27.6 km^{2} (10.7 sq mi)

Population
  - Total: 61 (2021 census)
  - Density: 2.210/km^{2} (5.72/sq mi)
- Time zone: UTC+10:00 (AEST)
- Postcode: 4615
Suburbs around Barker Creek Flat
Hodgleigh	Hodgleigh	Booie
Kunioon	Barker Creek Flat	Glan Devon
Kunioon	Nanango	Nanango

Barker Creek Flat is a rural locality in the South Burnett Region, Queensland, Australia. In the 2021 census, Barker Creek Flat had a population of 61 people.

== Geography ==
Darli is a former railway station on the now-closed Nanango railway line in the south-east of the locality (26.6588°S 151.9775°E).

== History ==
In 1922, the district was described in Queensland Parliament as having "thousands of acres of land now being planted with cotton, luccrno, maize, and other crops" to justify the extension of the railway line to Nanango.

== Demographics ==
In the 2016 census, Barker Creek Flat had a population of 50 people.

In the 2021 census, Barker Creek Flat had a population of 61 people.

== Education ==
There are no schools in Barker Creek Flat. The nearest government primary schools are Nanango State School in neighbouring Nanango to the south-east and Coolabunia State School in Coolabunia to the north-west. The nearest government secondary school is Nanango State High School, also in Nanango.
