= Hodgleigh =

- Suburb
- Interactive map of Hodgleigh
- Coordinates: 26.6108°S 151.9386°E
- Country: Australia
- State: Queensland
- LGA: South Burnett Region
- Location: 10.7 km (6.6 mi) NW of Nanango; 18.6 km (11.6 mi) SE of Kingaroy; 149 km (93 mi) N of Toowoomba; 200 km (120 mi) NW of Brisbane

Government
  - State electorate: Nanango
  - Federal division: Maranoa

Area
  - Total: 36.4 km^{2} (14.1 sq mi)

Population
  - Total: 134 (2021 census)
  - Density: 3.681/km^{2} (9.53/sq mi)
- Time zone: UTC+10:00 (AEST)
- Postcode: 4610
Suburbs around Hodgleigh
Booie	Booie	Booie
Coolabunia	Hodgleigh	Booie
Goodger	Kunioon	Barker Creek Flat

Hodgleigh is a rural locality in the South Burnett Region, Queensland, Australia. In the 2021 census, Hodgleigh had a population of 134 people.

== History ==
The name Hodgleigh was originally used a railway station name assigned by the Queensland Railways Department on 15 March 1911, after Queensland politician Robert Samuel Hodge.

Horse Creek Provisional School opened on 18 February 1902. In 1907, it was renamed Bell Bird Provisional School. On 1 January 1909, it became Bell Bird State School. It was at 12 Bellbird Road (26.62232°N 151.91988°E). In 1923, it was replaced by Hodgleigh State School. It closed on 4 November 1956.

== Demographics ==
In the 2016 census, Hodgleigh had a population of 137 people.

In the 2021 census, Hodgleigh had a population of 134 people.

== Education ==
There are no schools in Hodgleigh. The nearest government primary schools are Coolabunia State School in neighbouring Coolabunia to the west and Nanango State School in Nanango to the south-east. The nearest government secondary schools are Nanango State High School in Nanango to the south-east and Kingaroy State High School in Kingaroy to the north-west. There are also non-government schools in Nanango and Kingaory.
