= Kunioon, Queensland =

Kunioon
- Suburb
- Interactive map of Kunioon
- Coordinates: 26.6691°S 151.9025°E
- Country: Australia
- State: Queensland
- LGA: South Burnett Region
- Location: 14.5 km (9.0 mi) W of Nanango; 26.1 km (16.2 mi) SSE of Kingaroy; 139 km (86 mi) N of Toowoomba; 214 km (133 mi) NW of Brisbane

Government
  - State electorate: Nanango
  - Federal division: Maranoa

Area
  - Total: 29.2 km^{2} (11.3 sq mi)

Population
  - Total: 28 (2021 census)
  - Density: 0.959/km^{2} (2.48/sq mi)
- Time zone: UTC+10:00 (AEST)
- Postcode: 4615
Suburbs around Kunioon
Goodger	Hodgleigh	Barker Creek Flat
Goodger	Kunioon	Nanango
Goodger	Brooklands	Brooklands

Kunioon is a rural locality in the South Burnett Region, Queensland, Australia. In the 2021 census, Kunioon had a population of 28 people.

== Geography ==
Barker Creek enters the locality from the south (Brooklands) and exits to the north-east (Barker Creek Flat).

The land use is mostly grazing on native vegetation, but there is crop growing around Barker Creek and some other smaller creeks in the locality.

== History ==
Kunioon Provisional School opened on 8 June 1891. It later become Kunioon State School and closed in 1925. It reopened in 1928 and closed permanently circa December 1931. It was on the southern side of the Nanango Brooklands Road (approx 26.69438°S 151.90964°E), now within the locality of Brooklands.

Kunioon West Provisional School opened on 20 January 1902. On 1 January 1909, it became Kunioon West State School. It closed on 29 September 1946. It was on the north-western corner of the intersection of Goodger Gully Road, Kunioon West Road, and School Road (26.65598°S 151.86448°E), now within the locality of Goodger.

== Demographics ==
In the 2016 census, Kunioon had a population of 31 people.

In the 2021 census, Kunioon had a population of 28 people.

== Education ==
There are no schools in Kunioon. The nearest government primary schools are Nanango State School in neighbouring Nanango to the east and Coolabunia State School in Coolabunia to the north. The nearest government secondary school is Nanango State High School, also in Nanango. There is also a Catholic primary school in Nanango.
