= Leioproctus insitus =

Scientific classification
- Kingdom: Animalia
- Phylum: Arthropoda
- Clade: Pancrustacea
- Class: Insecta
- Order: Hymenoptera
- Family: Colletidae
- Genus: Leioproctus
- Species: L. insitus

Binomial name
- Leioproctus insitus Maynard 2013

Species of bee

Leioproctus insitus, or Leioproctus (Minycolletes) insitus, is a species of bee in the family Colletidae and subfamily Colletinae. It is endemic to Australia. It was described by Australian entomologist Glynn Maynard in 2013.

== Etymology ==
The specific epithet insitus is Latin for "border" or "flounce", referring to an apical fringe on the male metasoma.

== Description ==
Female body length is about 7 mm, male body length 6 mm. Integumental colouration is brown to black. The hair is white to pale brown.

== Distribution and habitat ==
The species occurs in eastern Australia. The type locality is 3.2 km south of Nanango, in south-east Queensland.

== Behaviour ==
The adults are flying mellivores. Flowering plants visited by the bees include Leptospermum species.
