= Goodger, Queensland =

Goodger
- Suburb
- Interactive map of Goodger
- Coordinates: 26.6572°S 151.8144°E
- Country: Australia
- State: Queensland
- LGA: South Burnett Region
- Location: 14.7 km (9.1 mi) SSW of Kingaroy; 137 km (85 mi) N of Toowoomba; 216 km (134 mi) NW of Brisbane

Government
  - State electorate: Nanango
  - Federal division: Maranoa

Area
  - Total: 81.1 km^{2} (31.3 sq mi)

Population
  - Total: 176 (2021 census)
  - Density: 2.170/km^{2} (5.621/sq mi)
- Time zone: UTC+10:00 (AEST)
- Postcode: 4610
Suburbs around Goodger
Inverlaw	Taabinga	Coolabunia
Haly Creek	Goodger	Hodgleigh
Haly Creek	Brooklands	Kunioon

Goodger is a rural locality in the South Burnett Region, Queensland, Australia. In the 2021 census, Goodger had a population of 176 people.

== Geography ==
Boonenne is a neighbourhood in the north-west of the locality (26.6166°S 151.8°E).

The Kingaroy-Cooyar Road enters the locality from the south (Brooklands) and exits to the north (Taabinga).

The land use is a mixture of grazing on native vegetation with some crop growing and rural residential housing.

== History ==
The locality was named after the former Goodger railway station (26.65649°S 151.81885°E) on the Tarong railway line which operated from 1915 to 1961, after the Goodger brothers (George, James and Howard A.) who were pioneer selectors.

Kunioon West Provisional School opened on 20 January 1902. On 1 January 1909, it became Kunioon West State School. It closed on 29 September 1946. It was on the north-western corner of the intersection of Goodger Gully Road, Kunioon West Road, and School Road (26.65598°S 151.86448°E).

The Boonenne railway station was also on the Tarong railway line (26.6127°S 151.8047°E). The name Boonenne is a corruption of an Waka word boon-u-inn meaning myrtle tree. It was named by the Queensland Railways Department on 25 September 1914.

Stratharlie State School opened in 1915. In 1917, it was renamed Goodger State School. It closed on 10 August 1962. It was at Kingaroy Cooyar Road (26.65649°S 151.81885°E). The old school building is still on the site.

The district was the only area in Queensland with known kaolin deposits of economic importance between 1950 and 1986, and it consequently supplied all kaolin produced in the state. The earliest workings, known as Campbell's Pit, were in the south west of the locality.

== Demographics ==
In the 2016 census, Goodger had a population of 187 people.

In the 2021 census, Goodger had a population of 176 people.

== Economy ==
A granite quarry operates in the central west of the locality.

== Education ==
There are no schools in Goodger. The nearest government primary schools are:

- Taabinga State School in Kingaroy to the north
- Coolabunia State School in neighbouring Coolabunia to the north-east
- Nanango State School in Nanango to the east
- Kumbia State School in Kumbia to the south-west

The nearest government secondary schools are Kingaroy State High School in Kingaroy and Nanango State High School in Nanango.
