= Bunya Mountains, Queensland =

Bunya Mountains
- Suburb
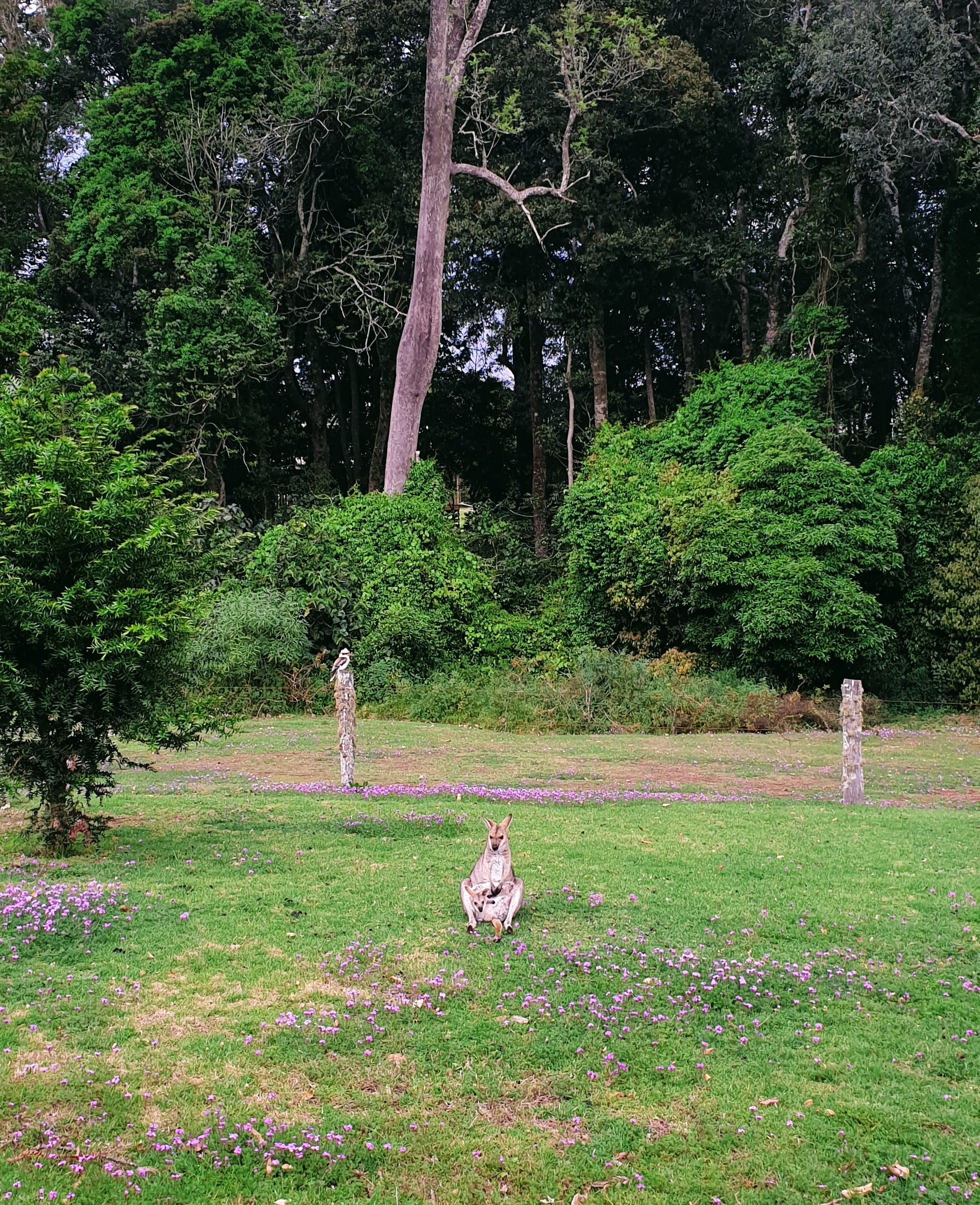
- Red-necked Wallaby with joey, Rainforest Drive, 2021

- Interactive map of Bunya Mountains
- Coordinates: 26.8780°S 151.55°E
- Country: Australia
- State: Queensland
- LGAs: Western Downs Region; South Burnett Region
- Location: 57.8 km (35.9 mi) SW of Kingaroy; 59 km (37 mi) SW of Nanango; 62.6 km (38.9 mi) NE of Dalby; 109 km (68 mi) NNW of Toowoomba; 234 km (145 mi) NW of Brisbane

Government
  - State electorates: Callide; Nanango
  - Federal division: Maranoa

Area
  - Total: 371.0 km^{2} (143.2 sq mi)

Population
  - Total: 110 (2021 census)
  - Density: 0.296/km^{2} (0.77/sq mi)
- Time zone: UTC+10:00 (AEST)
- Postcode: 4405
Suburbs around Bunya Mountains
Cooranga	Boyneside	Alice Creek
Bell	Bunya Mountains	Wengenville
Moola	Rangemore; Upper Cooyar Creek	Pimpimbudgee

Bunya Mountains is a rural locality split between the Western Downs Region and the South Burnett Region, Queensland, Australia. The town of Mount Mowbullan (26.8853°S 151.5972°E) is located on the boundary of Bunya Mountains and the enclosed locality of Mowbullan. In the 2021 census, Bunya Mountains had a population of 110 people.

== Geography ==
The locality is split between the two local government areas: the smaller north-eastern part of the locality in South Burnett Region and the larger south-western part in the Western Downs Region. The north-eastern part is almost entirely within the Bunya Mountains National Park, with a small portion of the south-western part also in the National Park. In contrast, most of the south-western part is freehold land used for agriculture. However, only a very small portion of the north-eastern part as freehold land, used for residential and agricultural purposes. The Bunya Mountain Road roughly follows the split between the two local government areas.

The Bunya Highway passes through the western corner of the locality.

The locality of Mowbullan (in the Western Downs Region) is completely enclosed by the locality of Bunya Mountains and does not form part of the national park. This enclosure within another locality is unusual in Queensland and contrary to the Queensland Government's normal policies.

== History ==
The locality name comes from the mountain range, Bunya Mountains, and is a Kabi language word bonyi or bunyi, indicating the bunya pine tree (Araucaria bidwillii).

Sunnyvale State School (also known as Sunny Vale State School) opened on 11 July 1911 and closed in 1958. It was on a 5-acre (2.0 ha) site on the eastern corner of Sunnyvale Road and Blancks Road (26.88584°S 151.46702°E).

Woodlawn State School opened in early 1916. It closed circa 1944. It was on the southern corner of the junction of Woodlawn Road and Woodlawn School Road (26.95892°S 151.53423°E).

Bunya Mountains Provisional School opened on 6 October 1919 and closed on 15 December 1922.

Montgreen Provisional School opened on 28 January 1919. In 1921, it was renamed Walker's Creek State School. The school closed in August 1939, but reopened in January 1948. It closed permanently in December 1958. It was on the western side of Walkers Creek Road (approx 26.8494°S 151.4550°E).

A 670-metre tramway with a 250 metre descent from the mountain top to the bottom at Wengenville used winches, winders and flying foxes from 1923 to 1928. The logs were transferred to a horse-drawn tram for movement to a log dump. A "not to scale" model of the tramway can be seen at the natural history museum at the Dandabah camping area.

== Demographics ==
In the 2016 census, Bunya Mountains had a population of 144 people.

In the 2021 census, Bunya Mountains had a population of 110 people.

== Education ==
There are no schools in the locality of Bunya Mountains. The nearest government primary schools are Bell State School in neighbouring Bell to the west, Kumbia State School in Kumbia to the north, and Quinalow State School in Quinalow to the south. The nearest government secondary schools are Quinalow State School (to Year 10) in Quinalow, Dalby State High School (to Year 12) in Dalby to the south-west, Kingaroy State High School in Kingaroy to the north-east, and Nanango State High School (to Year 12) in Nanango to the north-east.

== Amenities ==
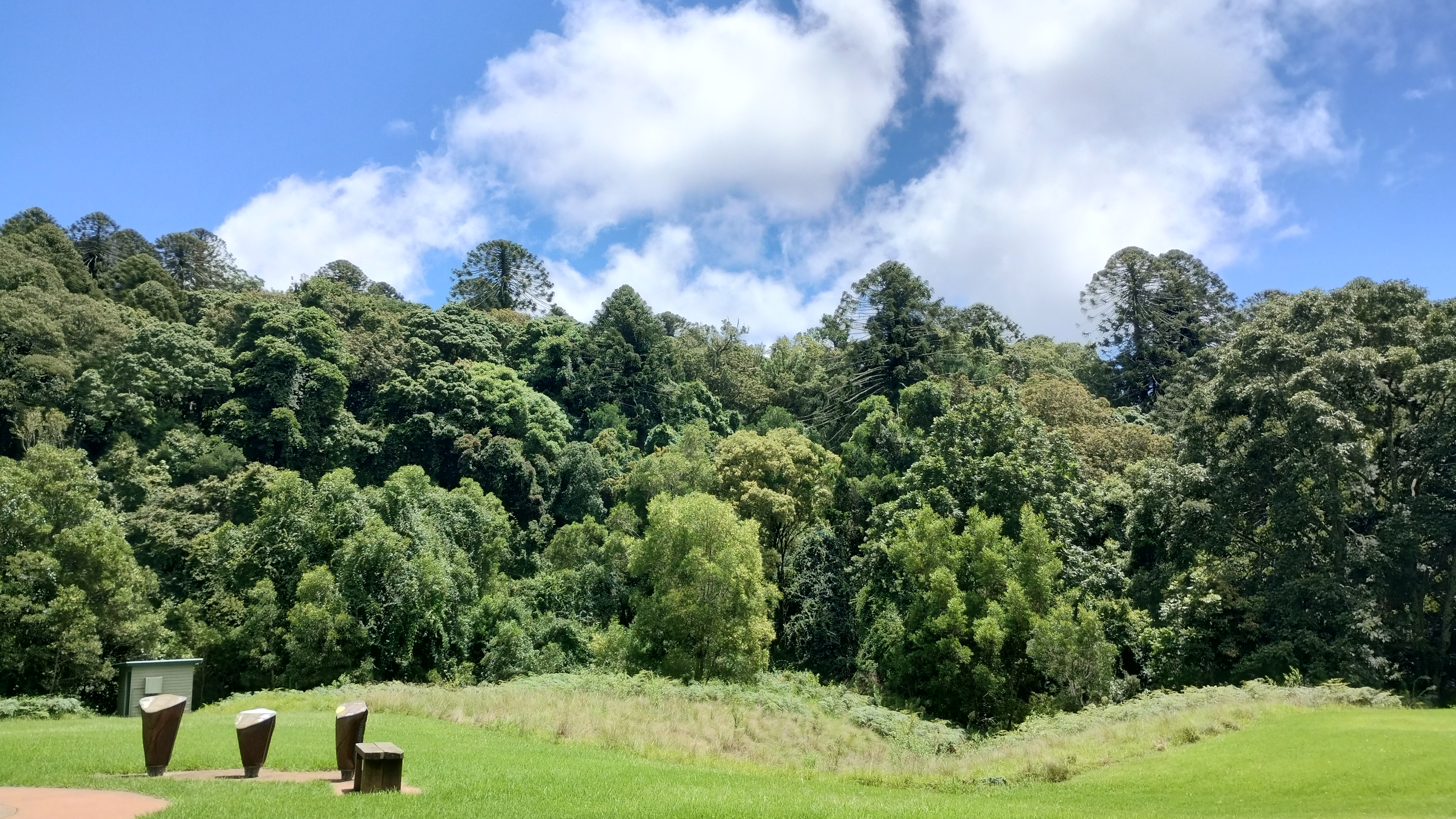
View from the Bunya Tavern, 2024

Bunya Tavern is in Bunya Avenue.

== See also ==
- List of tramways in Queensland
