= Malling, Queensland =

Malling
- Suburb
- Interactive map of Malling
- Coordinates: 27.0613°S 151.6058°E
- Country: Australia
- State: Queensland
- LGA: Toowoomba Region
- Location: 7.9 km (4.9 mi) NW of Quinalow; 42.5 km (26.4 mi) ENE of Dalby; 82.1 km (51.0 mi) NNW of Toowoomba CBD; 210 km (130 mi) WNW of Brisbane

Government
  - State electorates: Condamine
  - Federal division: Groom

Area
  - Total: 21.7 km^{2} (8.4 sq mi)

Population
  - Total: 40 (2021 census)
  - Density: 1.84/km^{2} (4.8/sq mi)
- Time zone: UTC+10:00 (AEST)
- Postcode: 4352
Suburbs around Malling
| Moola | Moola | Maclagan |
| Moola | Malling | Maclagan |
| Quinalow | Maclagan | Maclagan |

Malling is a rural locality in the Toowoomba Region, Queensland, Australia. In the 2021 census, Malling had a population of 40 people.

== History ==
Box Gully State School opened 13 August 1917. It was renamed Malling State School in 1922. It closed on 6 August 1971. It was on a 3-acre (1.2 ha) site on the eastern side of Malling Road (27.06882°S 151.59325°E). It is now Hansen Park.

== Geography ==
The Dalby–Cooyar Road runs along the southern boundary of the locality.

The land use is a mixture of grazing on native vegetation and crop growing.

== Demographics ==
In the 2016 census, Malling had a population of 27 people.

In the 2021 census, Malling had a population of 40 people.

== Education ==
There are no schools in Malling. The nearest government school is Quinalow State School (Prep to Year 10) in neighbouring Quinalow to the south. The nearest government secondary school offering education to Year 12 is Dalby State High School in Dalby to the south-west.
