= Ellesmere, Queensland =

Ellesmere
- Suburb
- Interactive map of Ellesmere
- Coordinates: 26.7427°S 151.7469°E
- Country: Australia
- State: Queensland
- LGA: South Burnett Region
- Location: 27.4 km (17.0 mi) SSW of Kingaroy; 28.8 km (17.9 mi) WSW of Nanango; 135 km (84 mi) N of Toowoomba; 214 km (133 mi) NW of Brisbane

Government
  - State electorate: Nanango
  - Federal division: Maranoa

Area
  - Total: 48.2 km^{2} (18.6 sq mi)

Population
  - Total: 334 (2021 census)
  - Density: 6.929/km^{2} (17.95/sq mi)
- Time zone: UTC+10:00 (AEST)
- Postcode: 4610
Suburbs around Ellesmere
Haly Creek	Haly Creek	Brooklands
Alice Creek	Ellesmere	Brooklands
Wengenville	Brooklands	Brooklands

Ellesmere is a rural locality in the South Burnett Region, Queensland, Australia. In the 2021 census, Ellesmere had a population of 334 people.

== Geography ==
The western boundary of the locality loosely follow the Stuart Range. Halys Round Mountain is in the south-west corner of the locality (26.7748°S 151.6918°E) rising to 655 metres (2,149 ft) above sea level.

Kumbia Road enters the locality from the east (Brooklands) and exits to the west (Alice Creek / Haly Creek).

The land use is predominantly grazing on native vegetation, but there is also some crop growing and an area of rural residential housing in the north-east of the locality.

== History ==
The Stuart Range was named by surveyor James Charles Burnett after the explorer Henry Stuart Russell, who explored the area in 1842.

In August 1913, local residents desired to establish a school. In March 1915, the Queensland Government reserved 5 acres (2.0 ha) of land for a school. In November 1915, tenders were called to erect a school building. Ellesmere State School opened in May 1916. In April 1922, the school was burned down and forced to close as the government would not agree to the temporary use of a farmer's barn as a school room; there were 46 children enrolled at this time. In December 1922, the government allocated £613 to build a new school building. It reopened on 16 July 1923. In 1961, it closed permanently. It was at 938 Kumbia Road (north-east corner of Ellesmere Road, 26.74038°S 151.72160°E). As at November 2020, the school building was still extant on the site.

In September 1922, 1 acre (0.40 ha) of land was reserved for a School of Arts.

== Demographics ==
In the 2016 census, Ellesmere had a population of 343 people.

In the 2021 census, Ellesmere had a population of 334 people.

== Education ==
There are no schools in Ellesmere. The nearest government primary school is Kumbia State School in Kumbia to the north-east. The nearest government secondary schools are Kingaroy State High School in Kingaroy to the north and Nanango State High School in Nanango to the north-east.
