= Bunya Highway =

Highway in Queensland

Bunya Highway Queensland
- Bunya Highway (green and black)

General information
- Type: Highway
- Length: 173 km (107 mi)
- Route number(s): State Route 49

Major junctions
- North end: Burnett Highway (State Highway A3) / Wide Bay Highway (State Route 49), Goomeri
- D'Aguilar Highway (State Route 96)
- South end: Warrego Highway (National Highway A2) / Moonie Highway, (State Route 49), Dalby

Location(s)
- Major settlements: Murgon, Wondai, Kingaroy, Kumbia, Bell

Highway system
- Highways in Australia; National Highway • Freeways in Australia; Highways in Queensland

The Bunya Highway is a state highway of Queensland, Australia. It is a relatively short road, running approximately 173 kilometres in a south-westerly direction from Goomeri to Dalby. The highway connects the Warrego and Burnett Highways.

It is a state-controlled regional road (numbers 45A (Dalby to Kingaroy) and 45B (Kingaroy to Goomeri)).

The Bunya Highway passes near the Bunya Mountains National Park, which is popular with tourists. The highway is named after the Bunya-bunya Araucaria bidwilli, which grows in the area and the seeds of which were (and still are) a favourite food of Aboriginal Australians.

The road continues east of Goomeri as the Wide Bay Highway, connecting it to Gympie.

In 2008, the intersection with Burnett Highway was reconstructed to favour Murgon-bound traffic.

== List of towns along the Bunya Highway ==
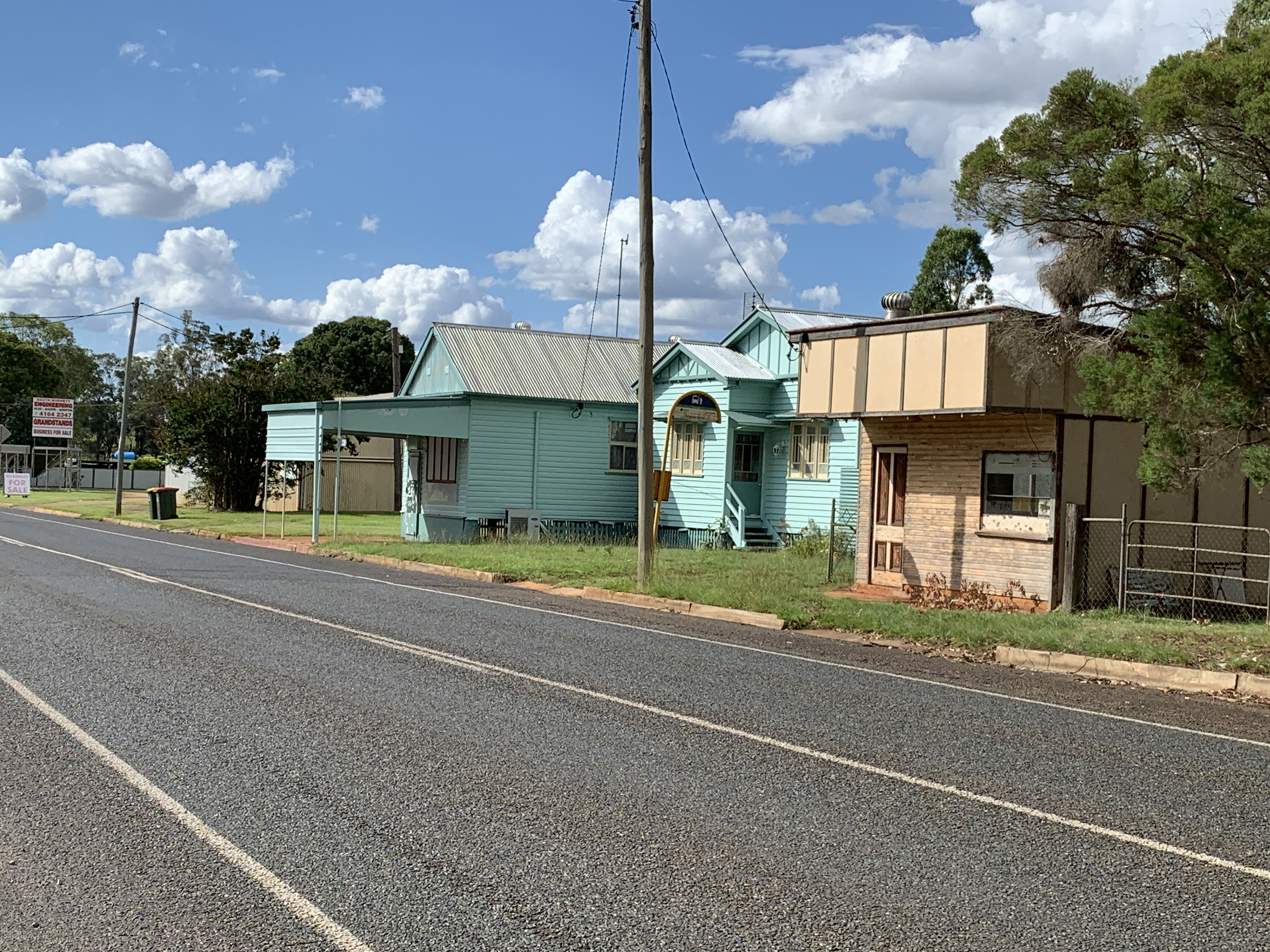
Old closed shops on Bunya Highway, main street in Memerambi, 2023

- Dalby
- Bell
- Kumbia
- Kingaroy
- Memerambi
- Wooroolin
- Tingoora
- Wondai
- Murgon
- Goomeri

== Major intersections ==
LGA	Location	km	mi	Destinations	Notes
Gympie	Goomeri	0	0.0	Burnett Highway (State Route A3) north – Ban Ban Springs / Wide Bay Highway (State Route 49) east – Kilkivan	Northern end of Bunya Highway. Northern concurrency terminus with Burnett Highway
Gympie	Goomeri	1.8	1.1	Burnett Highway (State Route A3) south – Nanango	Southern concurrency terminus with Burnett Highway
South Burnett	Kingaroy	62.0	38.5	D'Aguilar Highway (State Route 96) east – Nanango	
South Burnett	Kumbia	94.6	58.8	Bunya Mountains Road – south – Bunya Mountains	
Western Downs	Dalby	170.3	105.8	Dalby–Cooyar Road – east – Cooyar	
Western Downs	Dalby	172.2	107.0	Warrego Highway (National Route A2) east – Toowoomba / west – Chinchilla	Southern end of Bunya Highway. State Route 49 continues north–west for 450 metres, duplexed with the Warrego Highway, before turning south–west as the Moonie Highway.
1.000 mi = 1.609 km; 1.000 km = 0.621 mi: Concurrency terminus

== Intersecting state-controlled roads ==
The following state-controlled roads, from south to north, intersect with the Bunya Highway:

- Dalby–Cooyar Road
- Macalister–Bell Road
- Kingaroy–Jandowae Road
- Bunya Mountains Road
- Kingaroy–Burrandowan Road
- D'Aguilar Highway
- Memerambi–Gordonbrook Road
- Chinchilla–Wondai Road
- Wondai–Proston Road
- Murgon–Gayndah Road
- Kilcoy–Murgon Road
- Burnett Highway

== Kingaroy–Burrandowan Road ==
Kingaroy–Burrandowan Road
- Location: Bunya Highway, Taabinga to Chinchilla–Wondai Road, Chahpingah
- Length: 64.4 km (40.0 mi)

Kingaroy–Burrandowan Road is a state-controlled district road (number 428), rated as a local road of regional significance (LRRS). It runs from the Bunya Highway in Taabinga to Chinchilla–Wondai Road in Chahpingah, a distance of 64.4 kilometres (40.0 mi). It does not intersect with any state-controlled roads.

== Memerambi–Gordonbrook Road ==
Memerambi–Gordonbrook Road
- Location: Bunya Highway, Memerambi to Chinchilla–Wondai Road, Wilkesdale
- Length: 25.1 km (15.6 mi)

Memerambi–Gordonbrook Road is a state-controlled district road (number 4206), rated as a local road of regional significance (LRRS). It runs from the Bunya Highway in Memerambi to Chinchilla–Wondai Road in Wilkesdale, a distance of 25.1 kilometres (15.6 mi). It does not intersect with any state-controlled roads.

== See also ==
- Highways in Australia
- List of highways in Queensland
