= The Nanango News =

Front page of The Nanango News, 6 January 1912

The Nanango News was a newspaper published in Nanango, Queensland, Australia. It was published from December 1899 to February 1942. It was established by Mr McNamara.

In February 1942, the newspaper merged with the Kingaroy Herald, due to the rationing of paper during World War II.

Some editions from 1912 to 1913, 1920, and 1922 have been digitised and made available online via Trove.
