= North Maclagan, Queensland =

North Maclagan
- Suburb
- Interactive map of North Maclagan
- Coordinates: 27.0297°S 151.6830°E
- Country: Australia
- State: Queensland
- LGA: Toowoomba Region
- Location: 52.8 km (32.8 mi) ENE of Dalby; 84.4 km (52.4 mi) NNW of Toowoomba CBD; 211 km (131 mi) WNW of Brisbane

Government
  - State electorate: Nanango
  - Federal division: Groom

Area
  - Total: 13.2 km^{2} (5.1 sq mi)

Population
  - Total: 0 (2021 census)
  - Density: 0.00/km^{2} (0.00/sq mi)
- Time zone: UTC+10:00 (AEST)
- Postcode: 4352
Suburbs around North Maclagan
Rangemore	Rangemore	Rangemore
Maclagan	North Maclagan	Maclagan
Maclagan	Maclagan	Maclagan

North Maclagan is a rural locality in the Toowoomba Region, Queensland, Australia. In the 2021 census, North Maclagan had "no people or a very low population".

== History ==
The locality is named for being north of the town of Maclagan. The town was originally named Bismarck after Otto von Bismarck. Due to the anti-German sentiment during World War I, the town was renamed Maclagan in honour of Brigadier Ewen George Sinclair-Maclagan in 1916.

Maclagan North State School opened on 12 September 1922. It closed on 4 May 1962.

== Demographics ==
In the 2016 census, North Maclagan had a population of 5 people.

In the 2021 census, North Maclagan had "no people or a very low population".

== Education ==
There are no schools in North Maclagan. The nearest government primary school is Quinlow State School in Quinalow to the south. The nearest government secondary schools are Quinalow State School (to Year 10) and Dalby State High School (to Year 12) in Dalby to the south-west.
