= Alice Creek, Queensland =

Alice Creek
- Suburb
- Interactive map of Alice Creek
- Coordinates: 26.7622°S 151.6066°E
- Country: Australia
- State: Queensland
- LGA: South Burnett Region
- Location: 13.8 km (8.6 mi) SW of Kumbia; 40.3 km (25.0 mi) SW of Kingaroy; 181 km (112 mi) SW of Gympie; 226 km (140 mi) NW of Brisbane

Government
  - State electorate: Nanango
  - Federal division: Maranoa

Area
  - Total: 88.1 km^{2} (34.0 sq mi)

Population
  - Total: 50 (2021 census)
  - Density: 0.57/km^{2} (1.47/sq mi)
- Time zone: UTC+10:00 (AEST)
- Postcode: 4610
Suburbs around Alice Creek
Boyneside	Kumbia	Haly Creek
Boyneside	Alice Creek	Ellesmere
Bunya Mountains	Wengenville	Wengenville

Alice Creek is a rural locality in the South Burnett Region, Queensland, Australia. In the 2021 census, Alice Creek had a population of 50 people.

== Geography ==
Glencliff is a neighbourhood in the south-east of the locality (26.7666°S 151.6666°E).

The watercourse Alice Creek rises in the Bunya Mountains and flows north into the locality of Alice Creek, where it becomes a tributary of the Stuart River (26.7588°S 151.5946°E).

Bunya Mountains Road enters the locality from the north (Kumbia) and exits to the south-west (Bunya Mountains).

The land use is predominantly grazing on native vegetation with some crop growing and forestry.

== History ==
Glencliff State School (sometimes written as Glencliffe State School) opened on 16 April 1923. It closed in 1949. It was on the eastern side of Glencliffe Road (26.76035°S 151.66776°E).

Alice Creek State School opened on 19 September 1927. It closed in 1945. It was at 75 Alice Creek Road (26.7608°S 151.5970°E).

== Demographics ==
In the 2016 census, Alice Creek had a population of 60 people.

In the 2021 census, Alice Creek had a population of 50 people.

== Education ==
There are no schools in Alice Creek. The nearest government primary school is Kumbia State School in neighbouring Kumbia to the north. The nearest government secondary school is Kingaroy State High School in Kingaroy to the north-east.
