= Wengenville =

- Suburb
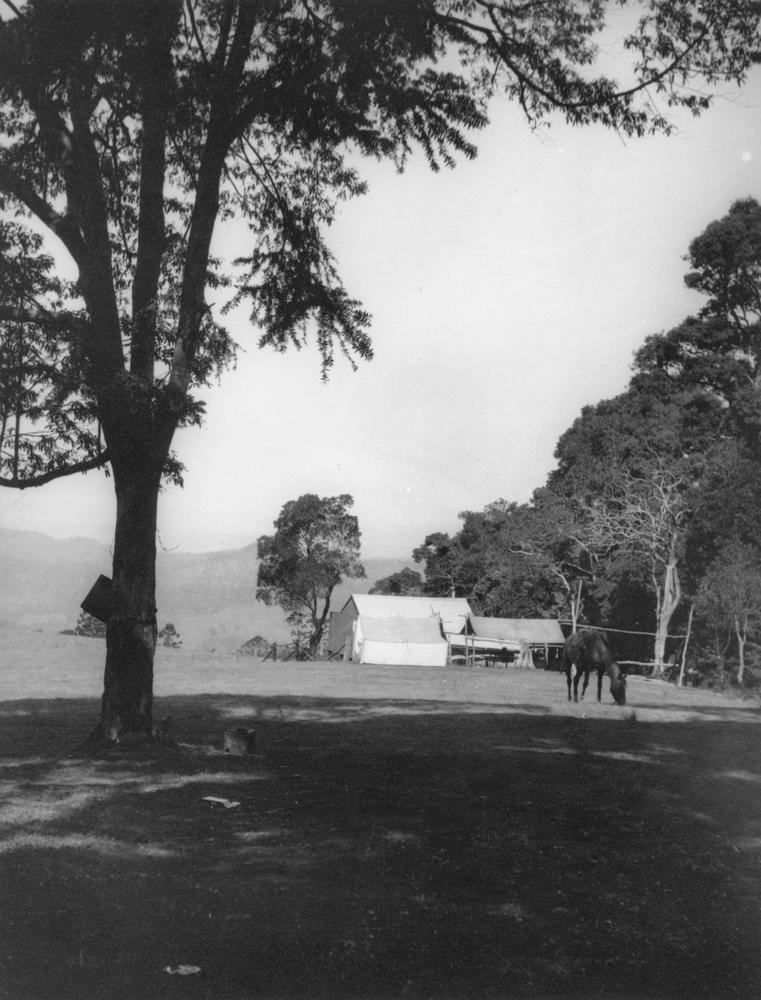
- Horse grazing near Munro's Camp, 1929

- Interactive map of Wengenville
- Coordinates: 26.8275°S 151.6872°E
- Country: Australia
- State: Queensland
- LGA: South Burnett Region
- Location: 44.2 km (27.5 mi) SW of Nanango; 48.2 km (30.0 mi) SSW of Kingaroy; 122 km (76 mi) N of Toowoomba; 223 km (139 mi) NW of Brisbane

Government
  - State electorate: Nanango
  - Federal division: Maranoa

Area
  - Total: 115.7 km^{2} (44.7 sq mi)

Population
  - Total: 54 (2021 census)
  - Density: 0.467/km^{2} (1.209/sq mi)
- Time zone: UTC+10:00 (AEST)
- Postcode: 4615
Suburbs around Wengenville
Alice Creek	Alice Creek	Ellesmere
Bunya Mountains	Wengenville	Maidenwell; Brooklands
Bunya Mountains	Pimpimbudgee	Pimpimbudgee

Wengenville is a rural locality in the South Burnett Region, Queensland, Australia. In the 2021 census, Wengenville had a population of 54 people.

== Geography ==
The Maidenwell Bunya Mountain Road, one of three ways to access the Bunya Mountains by road, passes through the locality from east to south.

The terrain varies from 410 to 800 metres (1,350 to 2,620 ft) above sea level. The land use is predominantly grazing on native vegetation with a small amount of crop-growing. There is a pocket of rural residential housing in the south-east of the locality near the Bunya Mountains.

== History ==
The locality's name is derived from Wengen Creek, which probably comes from the Waka language (Bujiebara dialect) word wingin, which comes from the local Indigenous culture involving an old woman whose name was Winyirgan.

Wengenville was probably named at the suggestion of the daughter-in-law of sawmiller Lars Andersen when the mill was erected on the site. The Bunya Timber Mills were started in 1923 and by August 1924, employed 56 men. A mountain tramway that fed logs to the mill had at its steepest a gradient of 1 in 1.5. The descent was accomplished by a winder known as a gravitation plant.

A postal receiving office was opened at the Bunya Cash Store in August 1929, and then Wengenville was the name given to the post office at Bunya Mills in November 1929. Henceforth all mail sent to that part of the district was to be addressed "Wengenville, via Maidenwell."

The mill closed in 1961 and shortly afterwards the township was abandoned .

Maidenwell Provisional School opened in April 1926. In 1934, a new school building was constructed and was opened as Wengenville State School. It closed in 1961. It was at 3 Wengen Creek Road (eastern corner of Maidenwell Bunya Mountains Road, 26.83813°S 151.69908°E).

== Demographics ==
In the 2016 census, Wengenville had a population of 46 people.

In the 2021 census, Wengenville had a population of 54 people.

== Education ==
There are no schools in Wengenville. The nearest government primary schools are Tanduringie State School in neighbouring Pimpimbudgee to the south-east and Kumbia State School in Kumbia to the north. The nearest government secondary schools are:

- Kingaroy State High School (to Year 12) in Kingaroy to the north
- Nanango State High School (to Year 12) in Nanango to the north-east
- Yarraman State School (to Year 9) in Yarraman to the east
- Quinalow State School (to Year 10) in Quinalow to the south

== See also ==
- List of tramways in Queensland
