= Dalby–Cooyar Road =

Road in Queensland, Australia

Dalby–Cooyar Road Queensland

General information
- Type: Rural road
- Length: 58.0 km (36 mi)
- Route number(s): No shield

Major junctions
- West end: Bunya Highway Dalby
- Dalby–Nungil Road; Bell–Kaimkillenbun Road; Bunya Mountains Road; Bowenville–Moola Road; Pechey–Maclagan Road; Bunya Mountains–Maclagan Road
- East end: Oakey–Cooyar Road Nutgrove

Location(s)
- Major settlements: Kaimkillenbun, Quinalow, Maclagan

The roads that join the towns of Dalby, Oakey and Cooyar form a triangle that encloses some of the most fertile land on the Darling Downs in Queensland, Australia. These roads are the Warrego Highway, Oakey–Cooyar Road and Dalby–Cooyar Road. Several of the more significant internal roads intersect with Dalby–Cooyar Road, and these are briefly described in this article, along with some significant external roads.

Dalby–Cooyar Road is a continuous 58.0 kilometres (36.0 mi) road route in the Western Downs and Toowoomba regions of Queensland. It is a regional road (number 416). It is part of the shortest route from the Sunshine Coast and Caboolture to Dalby.

== Route description ==
The Dalby–Cooyar Road commences at an intersection with the Bunya Highway (State Route 49) in Dalby. It leaves Dalby as Irvingdale Road and runs east, soon becoming Dalby–Cooyar Road. It turns north-east and reaches the eastern boundary of Dalby, where it passes the exit to Dalby–Nungil Road and turns north, passing between Dalby and Irvingdale before turning north-east and running through Kaimkillenbun from south to east. In Kaimkillenbun village it passes the exit to Bell–Kaimkillenbun Road and turns east.

At the eastern boundary of Kaimkillenbun it passes the exit to Bunya Mountains Road and enters Moola, which it runs through from west to east, passing the exit to Bowenville–Moola Road. It then runs between Quinalow and Maclagan for a short distance before passing the exit to Pechey–Maclagan Road and turning north-east into Maclagan. In Maclagan village Bunya Mountains–Maclagan Road exits to the west and then turns north. Dalby–Cooyar Road continues north-east through Maclagan until it nears the eastern boundary, where it turns east and enters Nutgrove. The road ends at an intersection with Oakey–Cooyar Road (State Route 68) in Nutgrove.

Land use along this road is mainly crop farming.

This road is part of a network that enables access to the locality of Bunya Mountains from three lowland points, thus providing alternatives in case of flooding, other natural disasters, or planned maintenance.

== Internal roads ==
=== Pechey–Maclagan Road ===
Pechey–Maclagan Road is a state-controlled district road (number 418), rated as a local road of regional significance (LRRS). It starts at Pechey on the New England Highway and runs west through several localities before entering the triangle at Rosalie Plains on the Oakey–Cooyar Road. It continues west to Brymaroo, where it turns north to Maclagan and ends at the Dalby–Cooyar Road.

In Brymaroo it intersects with Jondaryan–Nungil Road, thus providing a direct south–north link from the Warrego Highway at Jondaryan to Maclagan.

=== Bowenville–Moola Road ===
This road provides a direct south–north link from the Warrego Highway at Bowenville to the Dalby–Cooyar Road.

=== Dalby–Nungil Road ===
This road runs east from Dalby, intersecting with Bowenville–Moola Road and Pechey–Maclagan Road, thus providing a direct west–east link from Dalby to Rosalie Plains and beyond.

== External roads ==
=== Bunya Mountains Road ===
Bunya Mountains Road is a state-controlled district road (number 4161), rated LRRS. It runs from Dalby–Cooyar Road to the Bunya Mountains. It is part of the shortest route from Dalby to the Bunya Mountains.

=== Bunya Mountains–Maclagan Road ===
This is a state-controlled district road (number 4163), part of which is rated LRRS. It runs from Maclagan through Moola to the Bunya Mountains Road. Together with Jondaryan–Nungil Road and Pechey–Maclagan Road it provides a fairly direct route from the Warrego Highway at Jondaryan to the Bunya Mountains. There is an unsealed section of 2 kilometres (1.2 mi) on this road.

=== Bell–Kaimkillenbun Road ===
This road connects the Bunya Highway at Bell to the Dalby–Cooyar Road at Kaimkillenbun. Part of it is part of the shortest route from Bell to the Bunya Mountains.

== History ==
The Dalby area was settled in the 1840s, and a township was surveyed in 1853 and founded in 1854. A post office opened in 1855 and a school in 1861. The railway arrived in 1868, allowing the town to grow as the commercial centre for properties around it.

Irvingdale pastoral run was established in the 1840s. In 1849 a pastoral run named Cumkillenbar was established in the area now named Kaimkillenbun. The first roads were cut to enable access to the pastoral runs and other settlements for wheeled vehicles.

In 1889 the town that is now Maclagan was surveyed, and a butter and cheese factory was established in Quinalow. A reliable road connection from these towns to Dalby was needed to provide access to markets and larger items of equipment. The extension of the road to Cooyar was the logical completion of a "missing link".

Cooyar was first established as a pastoral run. In 1877 a total of 18,500 acres (7,500 ha) was resumed from Cooyar to enable the establishment of smaller farms.

== Major intersections ==
All distances are from Google Maps.

LGA	Location	km	mi	Destinations	Notes
Western Downs	Dalby	0	0.0	Bunya Highway (State Route 49) – north–east – Bell – south–west – Dalby CBD	Western end of Dalby–Cooyar Road.
Western Downs	Dalby / Irvingdale midpoint	7.4	4.6	Dalby–Nungil Road – east – Irvingdale	
Western Downs	Kaimkillenbun	22.0	13.7	Bell–Kaimkillenbun Road – north – Bell	Road turns east
Western Downs	Kaimkillenbun / Moola midpoint	25.7	16.0	Bunya Mountains Road – north – Mowbullan	
Western Downs	Moola	32.0	19.9	Bowenville–Moola Road – south – Bowenville	
Toowoomba	Quinalow / Maclagan midpoint	41.9	26.0	Pechey–Maclagan Road – south – Brymaroo, Rosalie Plains	Road turns north–east
Toowoomba	Maclagan	43.2	26.8	Bunya Mountains–Maclagan Road – west, then north – Moola, Mowbullan	
Toowoomba	Nutgrove	58.0	36.0	Oakey–Cooyar Road – north – Wutul – south – Highgrove	Eastern end of Dalby–Cooyar Road
1.000 mi = 1.609 km; 1.000 km = 0.621 mi

== See also ==
- List of road routes in Queensland
- List of numbered roads in Queensland
