= Nanango Court House =

1937 building in Queensland, Australia

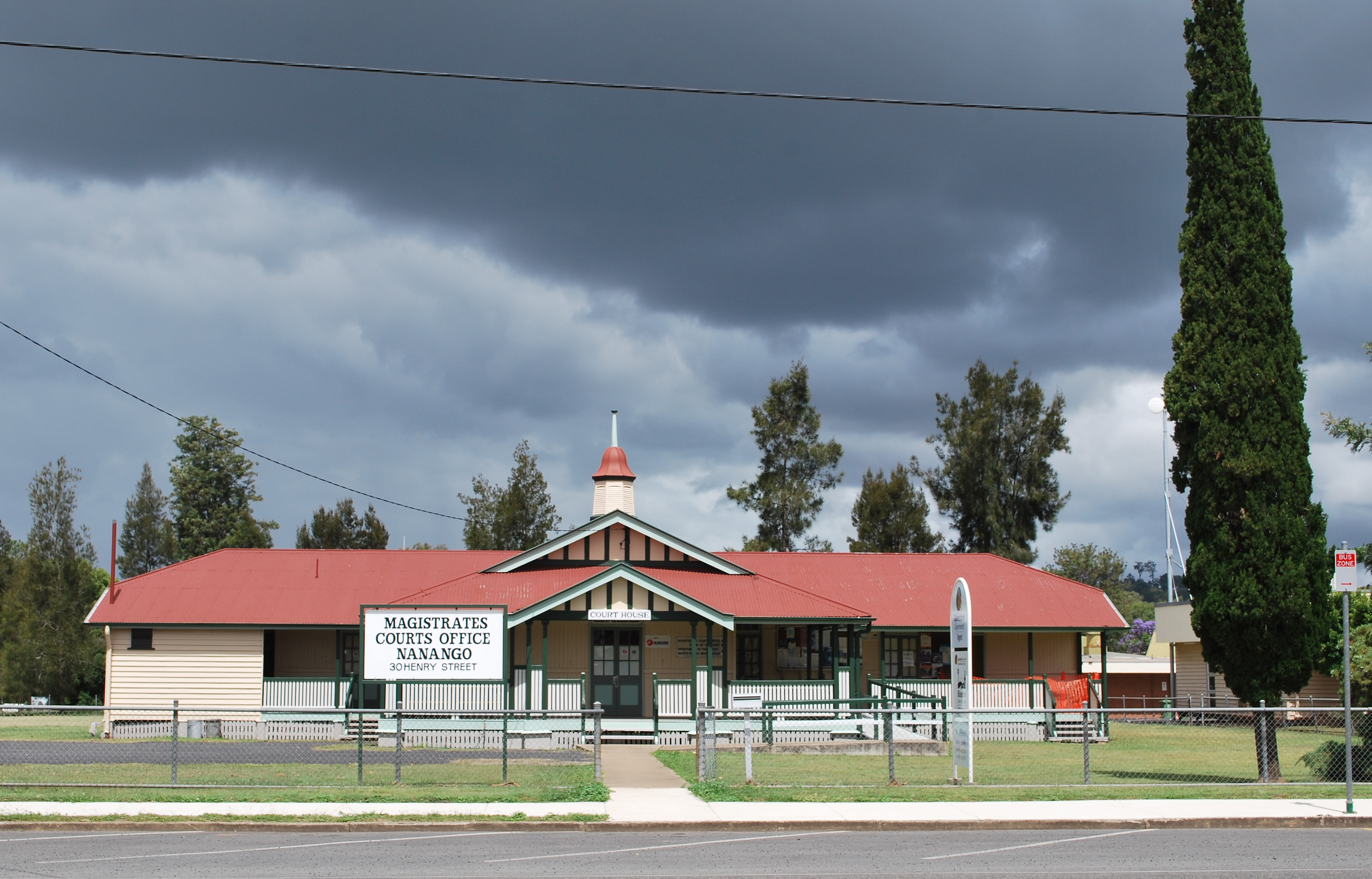
- Nanango Court House, 2010

- Location within Queensland Location within Australia
- 26.6704°S 152.0021°E
- Location: 30 Henry Street, Nanango, South Burnett Region, Queensland, Australia

History
- Design period: 1919–1930s (interwar period)
- Built: 1937

Site notes
- Architect: Department of Public Works (Queensland)
- Architectural style: Classicism

Queensland Heritage Register
- Official name: Nanango Court House
- Type: state heritage (built)
- Designated: 13 January 1995
- Reference no.: 601571
- Significant period: 1930s (historical); 1930s (fabric)
- Significant components: roof/ridge ventilator/s / fleche/s, office/s

Nanango Court House is a heritage-listed courthouse at 30 Henry Street, Nanango, South Burnett Region, Queensland, Australia. It was designed by Department of Public Works (Queensland) and built in 1937. It was added to the Queensland Heritage Register on 13 January 1995.

== History ==
Completed by late 1937, this single-storeyed timber building replaced a court house erected in 1912. The court house was designed in the office of the Department of Public Works; Andrew Baxter Leven was Chief Architect at the time.

The pastoral stations of Taromeo, Nanango and Tarong in the South Burnett district of Queensland, were taken up by selectors during the 1840s. In 1847, a prospector named Jacob Goode set up his camp near a waterhole on Nanango station, and reputedly established an inn. Goode proceeded to build stockyards and open a general store, and a post office was opened at the small settlement in about 1850. Gold was discovered in the Nanango district during the 1860s, and although the gold mining activity never lived up to the high expectations of the miners, it succeeded in attracting people to the area. A school was established in 1866, and it is noted that the first sale of town lots took place in October 1870. Records indicate that the area was opened up for closer settlement from the mid-1870s, and by the mid-1880s, the residential and business areas of the town was established. By the late 1880s, directories described the main features of the area as sheep and cattle grazing; mining reefs and splendid timber.

Tenders were called in 1862 for additions to the court house and lock-up at Nanango, and it is possible that it had been built during the late 1850s. Additions to the court house for a Lands Office were completed in 1889. By the early 1910s, there was antagonism between the towns of Kingaroy and Nanango as they vied for supremacy in the district. Nanango provided the headquarters of the official staff of Government Departments such as Justice and Lands which controlled extensive districts, and the town was given a boost in 1912, when the District Court of Nanango was established to serve the Petty Sessions Districts of Nanango, Weinholt and Kilkivan. With the anticipated expansion of official work to be carried out, plans were prepared and a new court house erected at Nanango in 1912.

By 1936, a new court house was again required, and plans were prepared. Tenders were called for and in December 1936, approval was given to construct the new court house for £1070. The new building was completed in August 1937, and included offices for the Dairy Inspector, Stock Inspector, Clerk of Petty Sessions and Land Ranger. The site of the building was east of the former building, fronting Henry Street. The former court house was sold for removal.

Additions to the court house were undertaken during the mid-1960s, and included the provision of a tea room, storage facility and toilets.

== Description ==
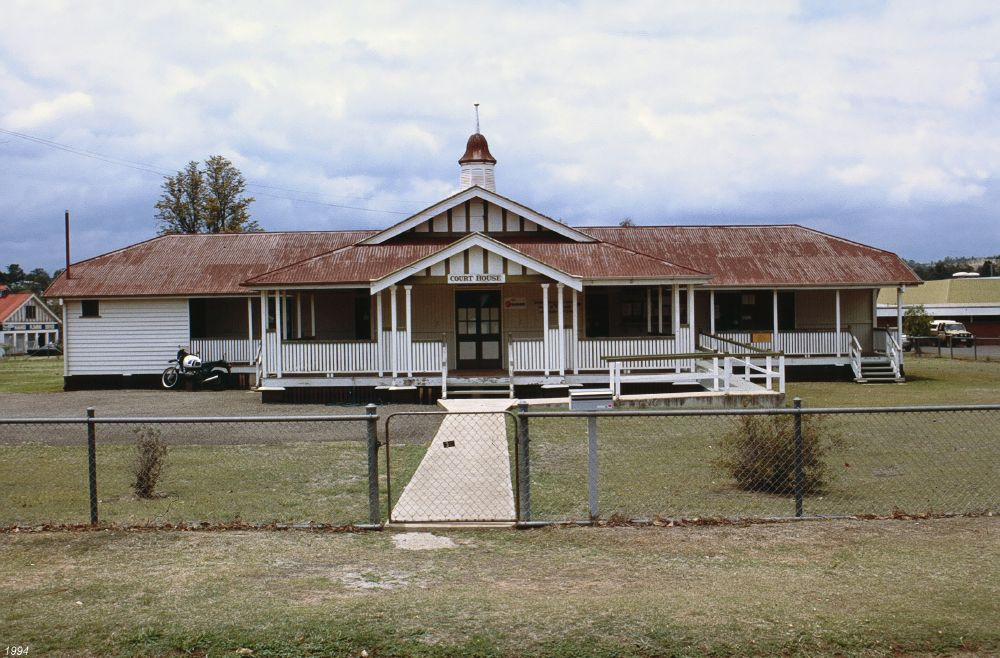
Court house, 1994

Nanango Court House is a symmetrically planned timber building with a corrugated-iron roof and a wide verandah on three sides. The roof is low-pitched, with prominent gables and wide overhanging eaves. The verandah roofs are supported by grouped timber posts. The projecting entrance is distinguished by a small gable on paired timber posts. Behind it is a half-gabled roof. The main ridge of the roof is surmounted by a large ventilator, with a flagpole, which forms the dominant decorative element of the building.

== Heritage listing ==
Nanango Court House was listed on the Queensland Heritage Register on 13 January 1995 having satisfied the following criteria.

The place is important in demonstrating the evolution or pattern of Queensland's history.

Erected in 1937, the Nanango Court House survives as an important illustration of the pattern of Nanango's development as an official centre for the South Burnett district of Queensland.

The place is important in demonstrating the principal characteristics of a particular class of cultural places.

Nanango Court House is a good example of a timber court house in a provincial centre. It reflects the high standard of Government buildings in Queensland, designed by the Department of Public Works during the early-mid 20th century.
