= Rangemore, Queensland (Toowoomba Region) =

Rangemore
- Suburb
- Interactive map of Rangemore
- Coordinates: 26.9955°S 151.6802°E
- Country: Australia
- State: Queensland
- LGA: Toowoomba Region
- Location: 12.6 km (7.8 mi) NNE of Quinalow; 55 km (34 mi) NE of Dalby; 86.6 km (53.8 mi) NNW of Toowoomba CBD; 216 km (134 mi) NW of Brisbane

Government
  - State electorate: Nanango
  - Federal divisions: Groom; Maranoa

Area
  - Total: 23.9 km^{2} (9.2 sq mi)

Population
  - Total: 0 (2021 census)
  - Density: 0.000/km^{2} (0.00/sq mi)
- Time zone: UTC+10:00 (AEST)
- Postcode: 4352
Suburbs around Rangemore
Moola	Bunya Mountains	Upper Cooyar Creek
Moola	Rangemore	Maclagan
Maclagan	Maclagan	North Maclagan

Rangemore is a rural locality in the Toowoomba Region, Queensland, Australia. In the 2021 census, Rangemore had "no people or a very low population".

== Geography ==
The Great Dividing Range forms the north-eastern and eastern boundaries of the locality. The locality is within the Murray-Darling drainage basin and is specifically within the catchment of the Balonne-Condamine River. Mount Mocatta lies close near the north-eastern boundary close to the range (26.9846°S 151.6886°E) and rises 825 metres (2,707 ft) above sea level.

The land use is predominantly grazing on native vegetation with some crop growing in the south.

== History ==
Rangemore State School opened on 17 March 1913. In 1917 it was downgraded to a half-time provisional school in conjunction with King's Tent Provisional School (meaning the two schools shared a single teacher). In 1918 King's Tent Provisional School closed and Rangemore once again became a full-time state school. It was finally closed circa 1962.

== Demographics ==
In the 2016 census, Rangemore had a population of 3 people.

In the 2021 census, Rangemore had "no people or a very low population".

== Education ==
There are no schools in Rangemore. The nearest government primary schools are Cooyar State School in Cooyar to the east and Quinalow State School in Quinalow to the south. The nearest government secondary schools are Quinalow State School (to Year 10) and Dalby State High School (to Year 12) in Dalby to the south-west. However, Dalby may be too distant from some parts of Rangemore; the alternatives are distance education and boarding school. There are also two non-government primary-and-secondary schools in Dalby.
