= Tarong railway line =

Former railway line in Queensland, Australia

Overview
- Status: Dismantled
- Termini: Kingaroy, Queensland; Tarong, Queensland (Near Maidenwell, Queensland)

Service
- Operator: Queensland Rail

History
- Opened: 5 December 1915
- Closed: 1 July 1961

Technical
- Track gauge: 3 ft 6 in (1,067 mm)

Tarong Branch Railway. Plans for this thirty kilometre branch line in south-east Queensland, Australia were approved on 12 December 1911 together with an undertaking to extend it further south to Cooyar. Opened on 15 December 1915, the line passed through sidings at Taabinga Village, Boonenne, Goodger, Archookoora and Brooklands.

A mixed train ran thrice weekly but on 1 July 1961 the line closed. The promised link to Cooyar was never built.
