= Coolabunia =

- Suburb
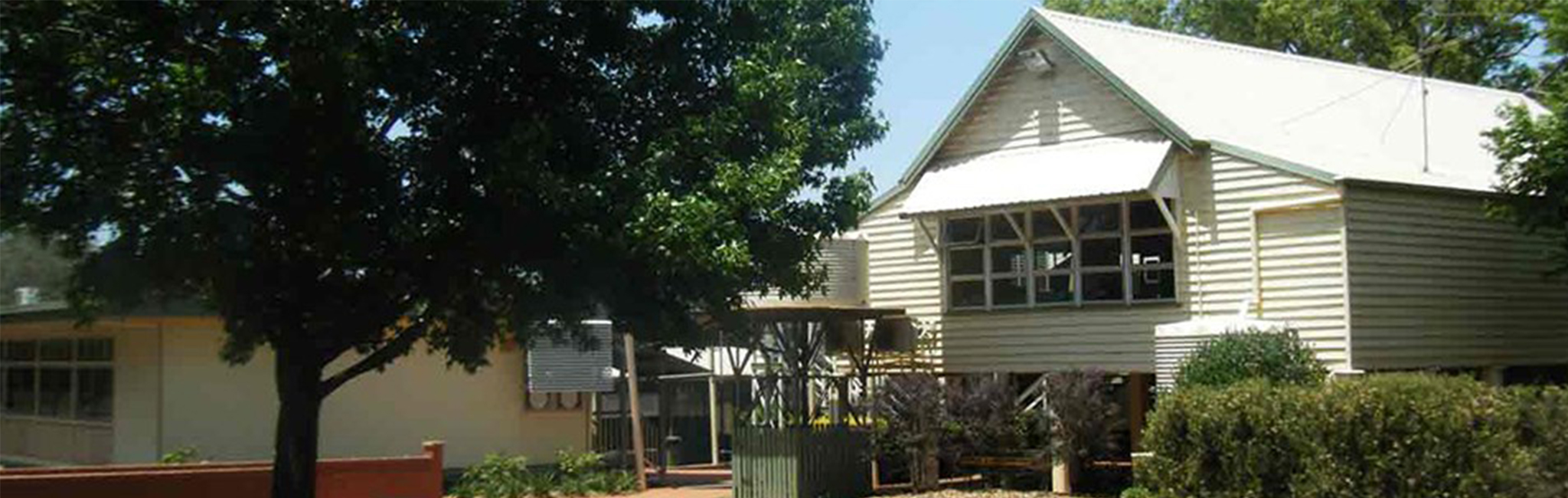
- Coolabunia State School, 2022

- Interactive map of Coolabunia
- Coordinates: 26.5858°S 151.8983°E
- Country: Australia
- State: Queensland
- LGA: South Burnett Region
- Location: 9.6 km (6.0 mi) SE of Kingaroy; 14.7 km (9.1 mi) NW of Nanango; 137 km (85 mi) SW of Gympie; 201 km (125 mi) NW of Brisbane

Government
  - State electorate: Nanango
  - Federal division: Maranoa

Area
  - Total: 41.2 km^{2} (15.9 sq mi)

Population
  - Total: 173 (2021 census)
  - Density: 4.199/km^{2} (10.88/sq mi)
- Time zone: UTC+10:00 (AEST)
- Postcode: 4610
Suburbs around Coolabunia
Kingaroy	Booie	Booie
Taabinga	Coolabunia	Hodgleigh
Goodger	Goodger	Hodgleigh

Coolabunia is a rural locality in the South Burnett Region, Queensland, Australia. In the 2021 census, Coolabunia had a population of 173 people.

== Geography ==
The D'Aguilar Highway passes through from south-east to north-west.

Hornley is a neighbourhood (26.5833°S 151.8833°E). It takes its name from the Hornley railway station name, which was named on 15 March 1911 after Ezra Horne and Hubert Horne, who were pioneer selectors in the area around 1887.

Ushers Hill is in the south-west of the locality (26.6008°S 151.8690°E), rising to 607 metres (1,991 ft) above sea level.

== History ==
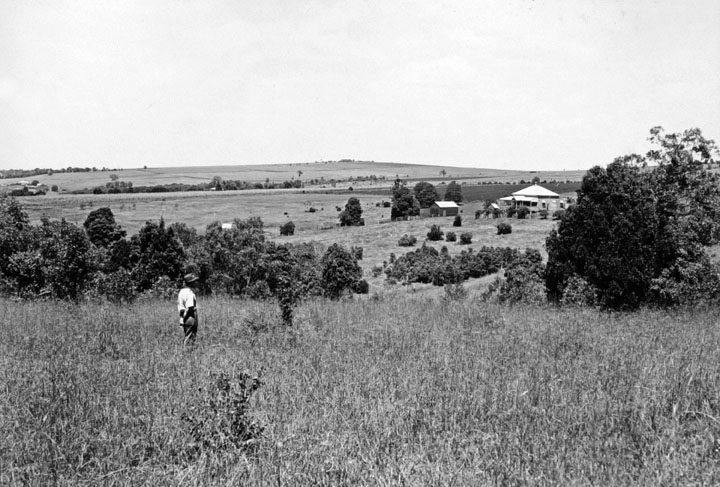
Coolabunia farmland, 1945

The locality name is derived from the Waka language, Bujiebara dialect, Gowrburra clan words "koala" and "buani" (meaning sleeping), as the area was a camp site on Aboriginal walking tracks to the Bunya Mountains. Coolabunia railway station, named for the locality, was on the former Nanango railway line.

Coolabunia Provisional School opened on 16 June 1891. On 1 January 1909, it became Coolabunia State School.

Coolabunia West Provisional School opened on 13 June 1904. On 1 January 1909, it became Coolabunia West State School. It closed circa 1936.

Coolabunia Methodist Church was built in 1914. It could seat 120 people. It was built from timber at a cost of £100. It has closed.

== Demographics ==
In the 2016 census, Coolabunia had a population of 161 people.

In the 2021 census, Coolabunia had a population of 173 people.

== Education ==
Coolabunia State School is a government primary (Prep-6) school for boys and girls at 2-26 Gipps Street (26.5893°S 151.9026°E). In 2018, the school had an enrolment of 104 students with 9 teachers (7 full-time equivalent) and 8 non-teaching staff (5 full-time equivalent).

There are no secondary schools in Coolabunia. The nearest government secondary schools are Kingaroy State High School in neighbouring Kingaroy to the north-west and Nanango State High School in Nanango to the south-east.

== Attractions ==
Despite its name, the Coolabunia bora ring is at Reagon Road in neighbouring Booie to the north (26.56484°S 151.91907°E).
