= Mowbullan, Queensland =

Mowbullan
- Suburb
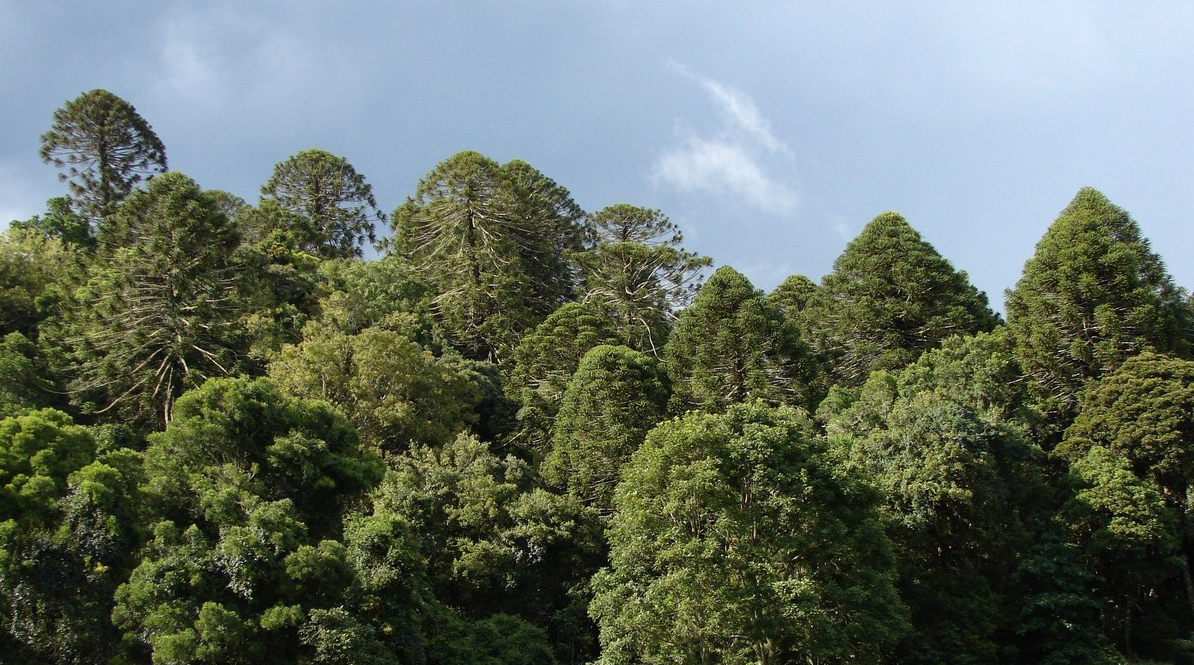
- Araucaria bidwillii forest, Mowbullan, 2009

- Interactive map of Mowbullan
- Coordinates: 26.8977°S 151.6111°E
- Country: Australia
- State: Queensland
- LGA: Western Downs Region
- Location: 58.1 km (36.1 mi) SW of Kingaroy; 58.4 km (36.3 mi) SW of Nanango; 61.3 km (38.1 mi) NE of Dalby; 108 km (67 mi) NNW of Toowoomba; 234 km (145 mi) NW of Brisbane

Government
  - State electorate: Callide
  - Federal division: Maranoa

Area
  - Total: 6.5 km^{2} (2.5 sq mi)

Population
  - Total: 12 (2021 census)
  - Density: 1.85/km^{2} (4.78/sq mi)
- Time zone: UTC+10:00 (AEST)
- Postcode: 4405
Suburbs around Mowbullan
Bunya Mountains	Bunya Mountains	Bunya Mountains
Bunya Mountains	Mowbullan	Bunya Mountains
Bunya Mountains	Bunya Mountains	Bunya Mountains

Mowbullan is a rural locality in the Western Downs Region, Queensland, Australia. In the 2021 census, Mowbullan had a population of 12 people.

== Geography ==
Mowbullan is completely within and surrounded by the locality of Bunya Mountains. The town of Mount Mowbullan (26.8853°S 151.5972°E) is located on the north-west boundary of the locality with Bunya Mountains. The urban area is mostly within Bunya Mountains with the residential areas extending into Mowbullan.

The Bunya Mountains Conservation Park is in the north-west corner of the locality, extending north into neighbouring Bunya Mountains.

The south-west of the locality is used for grazing on native vegetation, with the majority of the locality being set aside or nature conservation.

== History ==
The locality takes its name from the town of Mount Mowbullan and mountain of the same time. The name comes from the Waka language words mau meaning head and balan meaning bald, referring to the treeless nature of the mountain.

Mowbullan Provisional School opened on 15 February 1943. It was originally located about 1 kilometre (0.62 mi) from the sawmill in a clearing in the rainforest on land donated by grazier Allan Stirling. When the sawmill closed, the school was relocated to Danadabah where forestry workers were living. The school closed in April 1950 when there were too few students. The school building was later used as a National Parks Office. When a new office was built in 1986, the school building was shifted again and now is used as a home for chocolate wattled bats.

== Demographics ==
In the 2016 census, Mowbullan had a population of 11 people.

In the 2021 census, Mowbullan had a population of 12 people.

== Education ==
There are no schools in Mowbullan. The nearest government primary schools are Kumbia State School in Kumbia to the north-east and Quinalow State School in Quinalow to the south. The nearest government secondary schools are Quinalow State School (to Year 10), Kingaroy State High School (to Year 12) in Kingaroy to the north-east, and Nanango State High School (to Year 12) in Nanango to the north-east.
