= Brooklands, Queensland =

Brooklands
- Suburb
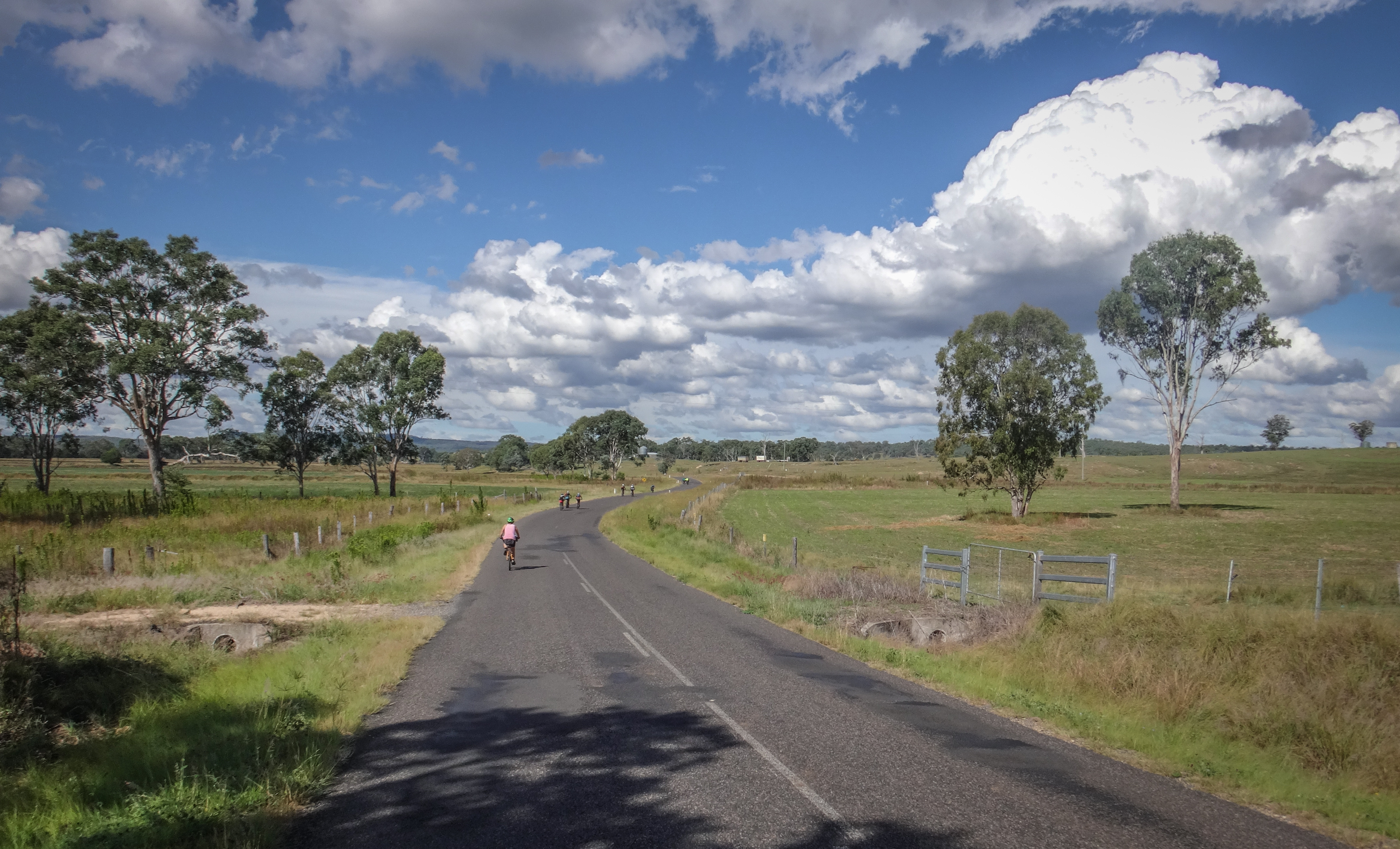
- Kumbia Road, Brooklands, 2016

- Interactive map of Brooklands
- Coordinates: 26.7275°S 151.8294°E
- Country: Australia
- State: Queensland
- LGA: South Burnett Region
- Location: 21.4 km (13.3 mi) SW of Nanango; 24.2 km (15.0 mi) S of Kingaroy; 128 km (80 mi) N of Toowoomba; 201 km (125 mi) NW of Brisbane

Government
  - State electorate: Nanango
  - Federal division: Maranoa

Area
  - Total: 90.0 km^{2} (34.7 sq mi)

Population
  - Total: 324 (2021 census)
  - Density: 3.600/km^{2} (9.324/sq mi)
- Time zone: UTC+10:00 (AEST)
- Postcode: 4615
Suburbs around Brooklands
Haly Creek	Goodger; Kunioon	Nanango
Ellesmere	Brooklands	South Nanango
Wengenville	Maidenwell	Tarong

Brooklands is a rural locality in the South Burnett Region, Queensland, Australia. In the 2021 census, Brooklands had a population of 324 people.

== Geography ==
There are a number of neighbourhoods in Brooklands:

- Archookoora (26.7333°S 151.8°E)
- Barkers Creek (26.7333°S 151.8166°E)
- Middle Creek (26.75°S 151.8166°E)

Archookoora takes its name from the former Archookoora railway station on the former Tarong railway line. It was named on 25 September 1915 by the Queensland Railways Department after a local property, whose name in turn was possibly derived from Kaibara words "Ngaitu Kuri" meaning turn or which way.

Barker Creek flows through the locality from the south-west to the north-east, and is eventually impounded by the Bjelke-Petersen Dam to create Lake Barambah in Moffatdale to the north-east.

The land use consists of irrigated crops around Barker Creek with the rest of the locality used for grazing on native vegetation.

== History ==
Barker's Creek Provisional School opened on 16 September 1895. In 1909, it became Barker's Creek State School in 1909. It closed in 1954. It was located on the western bank of Barker Creek between Taabinga Road and Nanango Brooklands Road (26.7111°S 151.8554°E).

Middle Creek Provisional School opened on 16 October 1916. On 1 September 1920, it became Middle Creek State School. In 1971 it was renamed Brooklands State School. It closed on 29 June 1973. It was at 36 Brooklands Pimpimbudgee Road (26.74258°S 151.81553°E).

== Demographics ==
In the 2016 census, Brooklands had a population of 294 people.

In the 2021 census, Brooklands had a population of 324 people.

== Education ==
There are no schools in Brooklands. The nearest government primary schools are Nanango State School in neighbouring Nanango to the north-east, Tanduringie State School in Pimpimbudgee to the south, Kumbia State School in Kumbia to the west, and Taabinga State School in Kingaroy to the north. The nearest government secondary schools are Nanango State High School in Nanango and Kingaroy State High School in Kingaroy.
