= Moola, Queensland =

Moola
- Suburb
- Interactive map of Moola
- Coordinates: 27.0388°S 151.5647°E
- Country: Australia
- State: Queensland
- LGA: Western Downs Region
- Location: 33.2 km (20.6 mi) NE of Dalby; 91 km (57 mi) NW of Toowoomba; 218 km (135 mi) WNW of Brisbane
- Established: 1800s (approx.)

Government
  - State electorate: Warrego
  - Federal division: Maranoa

Area
  - Total: 206.1 km^{2} (79.6 sq mi)
- Elevation: 460 m (1,510 ft)

Population
  - Total: 218 (2021 census)
  - Density: 1.0577/km^{2} (2.740/sq mi)
- Time zone: UTC+10:00 (AEST)
- Postcode: 4406
Suburbs around Moola
Bell	Bunya Mountains	Rangemore
Kaimkillenbun	Moola	Maclagan; Malling
Irvingdale	Irvingdale	Quinalow

Moola is a rural locality in the Western Downs Region, Queensland, Australia. In the 2021 census, Moola had a population of 218 people.

== Geography ==
Moola is 20 kilometres (12 mi) north of the Warrego Highway east of Dalby.

There are two neighbourhoods in Moola:

- Woodlawn in the north-west of the locality (26.9666°S 151.5333°E)
- Yamsion in the north of the locality (26.9833°S 151.5833°E)

The Dalby–Cooyar Road runs through from west to east. The Bunya Mountains Road runs to the north-east from the western boundary.

== History ==
The name Moola is claimed by Archibald Meston to be an Aboriginal word meaning possum.

Black Gully Provisional School opened on 19 September 1887 and circa 1891 was renamed Yamsion Provisional School. On 1 January 1909 it became Yamsion State School. From 1911 it operated as a half-time school in conjunction with King's Tent Provisional School (meaning the two schools shared a single teacher). In 1917 it returned to being a full-time state school. It closed on 31 December 1967. It was on Bunya Mountains Road just north of the Yamsion Hill Road (approx 26.9832°S 151.5852°E).

Moola Provisional School opened on 18 January 1904, becoming Moola State School on 1 January 1909. The school closed on 15 December 1967. It was north-east of the intersection of Moola School Road and Bowenville Moola Road (approx 27.0981°S 151.5332°E).

Moola Post Office opened by 1915 closed in 1962.

On Thursday 18 May 1922 an Evangelical Lutheran Church was opened and dedicated at Yamsion. The church building had originally been erected at Greenwood circa 1900 as the first Evangelical Lutheran Church in Queensland, but the Greenwood congregation had outgrown the building, so it was relocated to Yamsion.

Russellvale State School opened on 18 June 1930 and closed in 1960. It was at 989 Bunya Mountains Road (corner of Russelvale Road, 27.0040°S 151.5235°E).

== Demographics ==
In the 2006 census, Moola had a population of 325.

In the 2016 census, Moola had a population of 123 people.

In the 2021 census, Moola had a population of 218 people.

== Education ==
There are no schools in Moola. The nearest government primary schools are Kaimkillenbun State School in neighbouring Kaimkillenbun to the west, Quinalow State School in neighbouring Quinalow to the south, and Bell State School in neighbouring Bell to the north-west. The nearest government secondary schools are Quinalow State School and Bell State School which both offer secondary schooling to Year 10. For secondary schools to Year 12, the nearest government school is Dalby State High School in Dalby to the south-west.
