= Nanango =

- Town
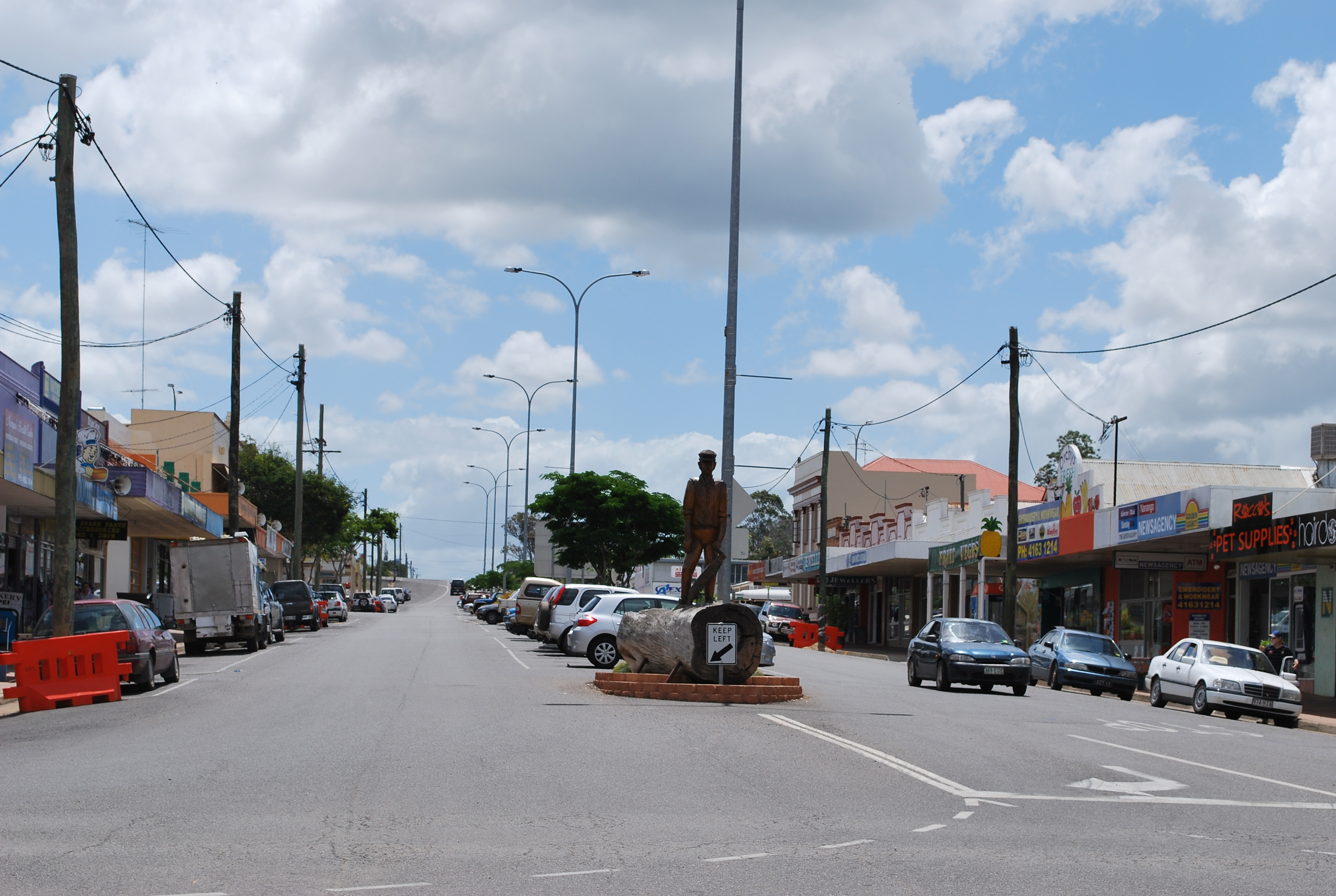
- Drayton Street, the main street of Nanango, 2010

- Interactive map of Nanango
- Coordinates: 26.6708°S 152.0002°E
- Country: Australia
- State: Queensland
- LGA: South Burnett Region
- Location: 24.4 km (15.2 mi) SE of Kingaroy; 138 km (86 mi) N of Toowoomba; 187 km (116 mi) NW of Brisbane

Government
  - State electorate: Nanango
  - Federal division: Maranoa

Area
  - Total: 31.2 km^{2} (12.0 sq mi)
- Elevation: 355.0 m (1,164.7 ft)

Population
  - Total: 3,679 (2021 census)
  - Density: 117.92/km^{2} (305.4/sq mi)
- Time zone: UTC+10:00 (AEST)
- Postcode: 4615
- Mean max temp: 25.4 °C (77.7 °F)
- Mean min temp: 10.4 °C (50.7 °F)
- Annual rainfall: 790.0 mm (31.10 in)
Localities around Nanango
Barker Creek Flat	Barker Creek Flat	Glan Devon
Kunioon	Nanango	East Nanango
Brooklands	South Nanango	South East Nanango

Nanango /nəˈnæŋɡoʊ/ is a rural town and locality in the South Burnett Region, Queensland, Australia. In the 2021 census, the locality of Nanango had a population of 3,679.

== Geography ==
Nanango is situated 190 kilometres (118 mi) north-west of the state capital, Brisbane, at the junction of the D'Aguilar Highway and the Burnett Highway.

Sandy Creek (26.670760°S 152.003907°E), which meanders through the town and locality, is part of the Burnett River catchment. The productive lands of the catchment feature sedimentary floodplains. The rich fertile soils of the floodplains are the agricultural and resource backbone of the region. While there are benefits from the flooding there are also risks, including the loss of vegetation in riparian zones, biosecurity problems and spread of weed species.

== History ==
The original inhabitants of the area are the Aboriginal people belonging to the Wakka Wakka (or Waka Waka) people. The area was used as a gateway to bunya nut festivals, for which Aboriginal people would travel from as far away as the Clarence River in northern New South Wales and the Maranoa River to feast on bunya nuts from the bunya trees.

The name Nanango has evolved from the Wakka Wakka word "nunangi", but there is dispute over its meaning. The word was either the name of a significant gathering place, or means "large watering hole", or was ascribed to a local Aboriginal elder at the time of European settlement.

In 1842 the Scott family opened Taromeo Station on the top of the Blackbutt Range. In 1847 John Borthwick and William Oliver from Ipswich, who took up pastures for sheep grazing in 1847. The first commercial establishment at the site of Nanango township was Goode's Inn, founded by prospector Jacob Goode in July 1848. The inn served travellers journeying from Brisbane and Limestone (now known as Ipswich), and became the meeting place for early residents of Taromeo, Tarong and Nanango stations. The town of Nanango quickly developed around it. Goode's original rough slab structure met the licensing conditions because his first licence for the "Burnett Hotel situated at Barambah Creek" was given at a special licensing meeting on 26 April 1849.

Nanango claims to be the fourth-oldest town in Queensland, but such claims depend on how the age of the town is determined. In some cases, it is by the first settlement (usually for pastoral purposes in or near the relevant town), or it might be date of the first survey for a town plan. Nanango's claim to be fourth-oldest is based on the first establishment of commercial premises, which is Goode's Inn. On that basis, it is the fourth oldest, following Ipswich (then called Limestone), Drayton, and Maryborough. However, Nanango was not surveyed as a town site until 1861, and several other towns were surveyed before that.

Goode's Inn Post Office opened on 5 January 1852. It had been renamed Burnett Inn by 1855 and became Nanango on 1 July 1859.

Nanango State School opened on 1 January 1866. In January 1955, it was expanded to have a secondary school department, an arrangement that continued until Nanango State High School opened on 25 January 1982.

Beef, dairy and timber, in particular the valuable red cedar (Toona ciliata), were the primary early industries in the area.

The discovery of gold at the Seven Mile Diggings near Nanango in 1867 precipitated a small gold rush, creating a local population boom.

Land in Nanango was open for selection on 17 April 1877, and 48 square miles (124 km^{2}) were made available.

The Nanango News commenced publication in December 1899. It was established by Mr McNamara. In February 1942, the newspaper merged with the Kingaroy Herald, due to the rationing of paper during World War II.

The Royal Hotel was built on Henry Street in late 1901, initially operating as a boarding house. In January 1902, Mrs Gillespie was granted a publican's licence to run the establishment as a hotel.

In June 1903, Nanango was the site of a criminal case following the shooting of publican Joseph Gillespie at the Royal Hotel on 11 June. Contemporary reports stated that Gillespie was shot shortly after 9 o’clock in the evening. The accused, Henry Corbett, was arrested and initially charged with wilful murder. He was committed for trial and appeared before the Brisbane Supreme Court in August 1903. During the trial, evidence was presented that Corbett had been heavily intoxicated at the time of the shooting. On the suggestion of the Chief Justice, the Crown Prosecutor reduced the charge from wilful murder to manslaughter. Corbett was convicted and sentenced to 12 months' imprisonment without hard labour, to be served at Boggo Road Gaol.

The hotel was sold to Jack Nugent on 13 April 1912.

At approximately 4:00 am on 28 January 1922, the Royal Hotel and a neighbouring building were destroyed by fire. Following a formal inquiry held on 10 February 1922, the fire was determined to have been accidental. On 7 April 1922, licensee Mary Griffiths applied to renew the hotel's licence and rebuild the premises. The application was opposed by the licensing inspector, and the hotel was never rebuilt.

Between 1905 and 1907, Nanango was the centre of a sequence of criminal cases involving several itinerant workers in the district. In 1905, Wallum Nabby was before the courts, charged with arson for allegedly burning down August Millewski's barn near Nanango. The Crown did not proceed with the prosecution after no true bill was filed.

Also in 1905, a man described in newspapers as an Indian labourer, Johnny Do, was killed, and Nabby, was charged with his murder. The case was heard at the Maryborough Circuit Court, and in 1906 Nabby was acquitted.

In August 1907, Nabby disappeared from the district and was later found murdered. Police investigations led to the arrest of August Millewski, who was tried at Maryborough in October 1907 and found guilty of Nabby’s murder. Millewski was sentenced to death on 17 October 1907 and was executed at Boggo Road Gaol on 16 December 1907.

A second population boom occurred when the Brisbane Valley railway line was extended to Yarraman in 1911. On 13 November 1911, Nanango railway station (26.6733°S 152.0023°E) became the terminus of a branch off the South Burnett railway line at Kingaroy. A 22.5-kilometre (14.0 mi) missing rail link between Nanango and Yarraman, although planned, was never built.

St Patrick's Catholic Primary School was established by the Sisters of Mercy on 28 April 1912.

In February 1913, 1,222 acres (495 hectares) of Nanango Station, in areas of from 63 to 122 acres (25 to 49 hectares), were advertised to be auctioned by Jno Darley and W. Hamilton, on behalf of Mr Jas Millis. A map advertising the auction stated that the Estate was situated 3 to 5 miles (5 to 8 km) from Nanango where there is "an up to date butter factory and public offices". The land was described as mainly creek flats fronting Barker's Creek, rich alluvial and black soil suited to growing lucerne, potatoes, wheat, oats and maize. Some blocks also have access to Meandu Creek as a permanent source for water.

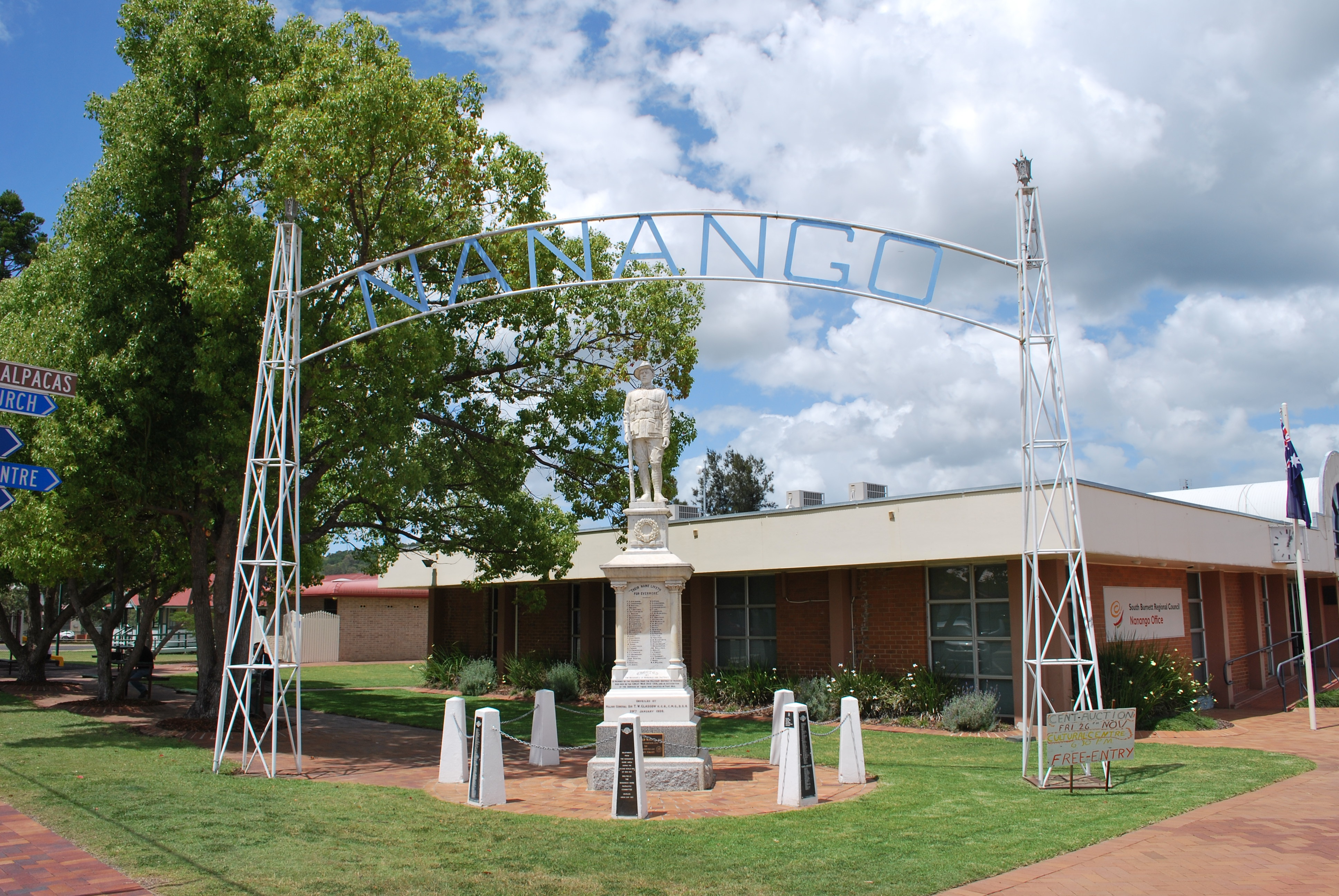
Nanango War Memorial, 2010

On 29 January 1920, the Nanango War Memorial was unveiled by Major-General Thomas William Glasgow.

A Baptist congregation was formed in Nanango in 1929 and was officially constituted in 1932. The Nanango Baptist Church officially opened at 81 Drayton Street (26.6710°S 151.9990°E) on Saturday 29 February 1936. In 1998, the congregation needed a more spacious church and relocated to a new building at 37 Mount Stanley Road, under the new name of Nanango Community Baptist Church. The old church was sold into private ownership.

The development of the Tarong Power Station led to a population increase in Nanango..

In April 1921, two subdivisions at Nanango and Tarong Estate and Township were advertised for auction by John Darley and Isles, Love and Co. The Tarong Estate, 12 miles (19 km) from Nanango and Tarong railway stations, offered 25 agricultural farms and 62 town allotments, while the Grange Estate, 11 miles (18 km) from Nanango and 18 miles (29 km) from Kingaroy, in the Parish of Booie, offered 15 dairy farms.

Nanango State High School opened on 25 January 1982, having previously been a secondary department attached to Nanango State School.

The Nanango Library opened in 1962.

== Population ==
In the 2021 census, the locality of Nanango had a population of 3,679.

In the 2016 census, the locality of Nanango had a population of 3,599.

In the 2011 census, the locality of Nanango had a population of 3,795.

In the 2006 census, the town of Nanango had a population of 3,083.

== Heritage listings ==
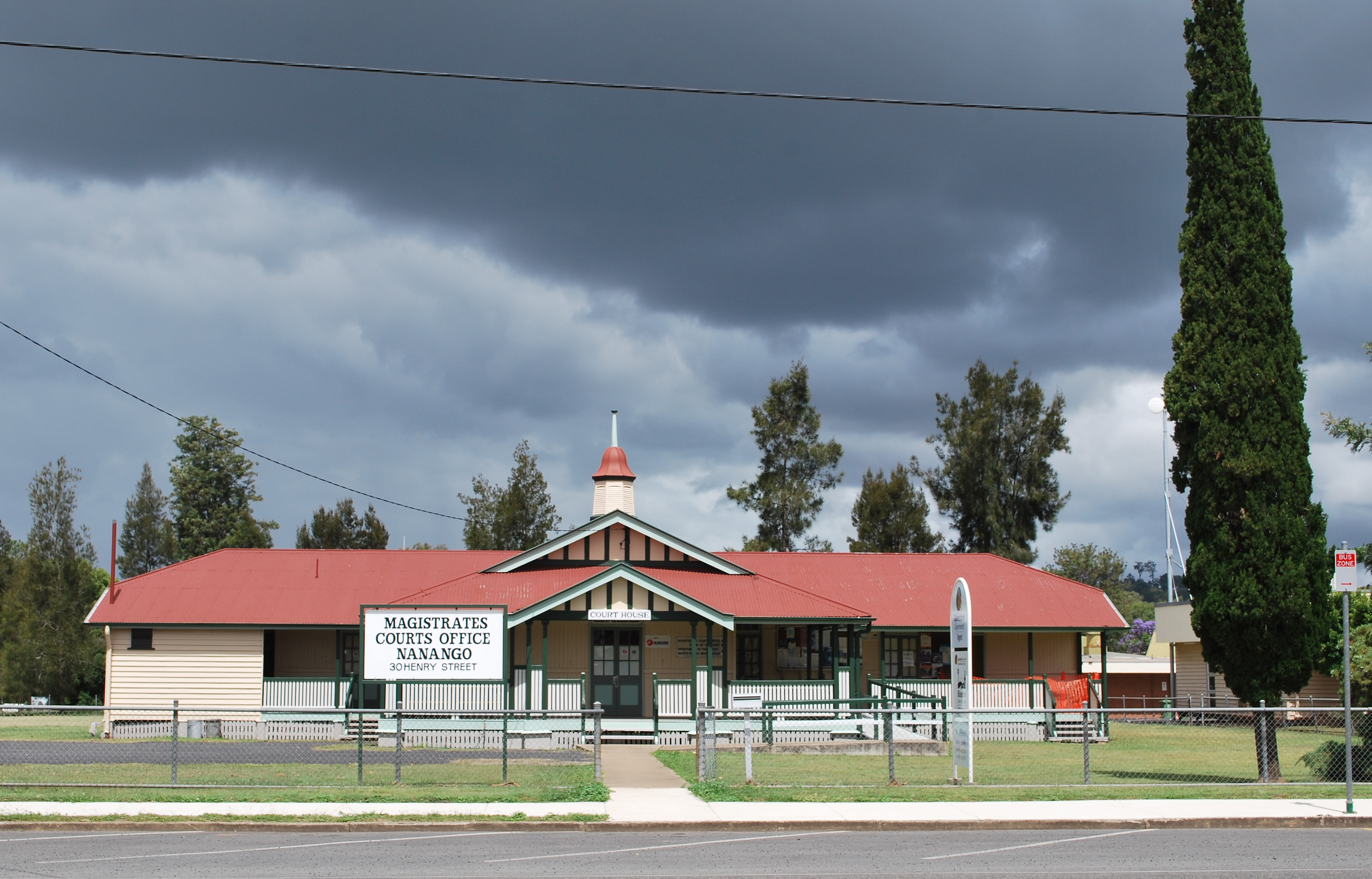
Court house, 2010

Nanango has a number of heritage-listed sites, including:

- Nanango Butter Factory Building, George Street (26.6698°S 152.0034°E)
- Nanango Court House, 30 Henry Street (26.6704°S 152.0021°E)
- Ringsfield House, a grand country residence and gardens. built by Robin Dods for Mrs Florence Graham in 1908, 41 Albert Street (26.6730°S 151.9939°E)

== Education ==
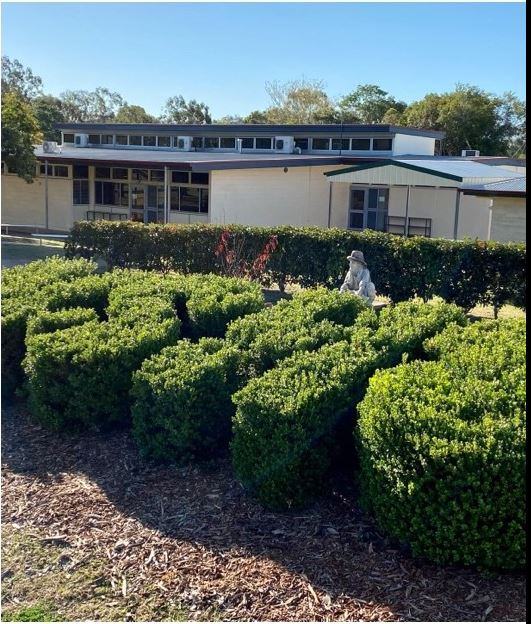
Nanango State High School, 2024

Nanango State School is a government primary (Early Childhood to Year 6) school for boys and girls, at 39 Drayton Street ( 26.6716°S 152.0055°E). In 2018, the school had an enrolment of 438 students with 37 teachers (34 full-time equivalent) and 26 non-teaching staff (18 full-time equivalent). It includes a special education program.

St Patrick's Primary School is a Catholic primary (Prep–6) school for boys and girls, at 16 Alfred Street (26.6725°S 151.9969°E). In 2018, the school had an enrolment of 77 students with 9 teachers (7 full-time equivalent) and 8 non-teaching staff (5 full-time equivalent).

Nanango State High School is a government secondary (7–12) school for boys and girls, at 54 Elk Street on over 35 acres (14 ha) of land (26.6678°S 151.9930°E). In 2018, the school had an enrolment of 522 students with 52 teachers (49 full-time equivalent) and 37 non-teaching staff (28 full-time equivalent). It includes a special education program.

== Facilities ==
Nanango Police Station is at 34 Henry Street (26.6697°S 152.0019°E).

Nanango Fire Station is at 14 Alfred Street (26.6726°S 151.9986°E).

Nanango SES Facility is at 29 Grey Street (26.6646°S 151.9975°E).

Nanango Hospital is a public hospital at 135 Brisbane Street (26.6663°S 152.0082°E). It has a heliport (26.6659°S 152.0076°E).

Nanango Ambulance Station is at 95 Drayton Street (26.6709°S 151.9978°E).

Nanango Cemetery is at 53 Applin Street West (26.6752°S 151.9917°E).

Nanango Aerodrome is in Racecourse Road (26.6896°S 151.9878°E).

== Amenities ==
Nanango Golf Club has a 18-hole golf course on Millis Way (26.6661°S 151.9817°E).

The South Burnett Regional Council operates a library in Nanango at 48 Drayton Street (26.6708°S 152.0020°E).

The Nanango branch of the Queensland Country Women's Association meets at its hall at 59 Fitzroy Street (26.6693°S 151.9999°E).

The Nanango Baptist Community Church is at 37 Mount Stanley Road (26.6690°S 152.0090°E).

Nanango Wesleyan Methodist Church is at 55 Cairns Street (26.6688°S 151.9935°E). It is part of the Wesleyan Methodist Church of Australia.

There are a number of parks in the area:

- Green Park (26.6689°S 151.9914°E)
- Lee Park (26.6913°S 151.9899°E)
- Lions Park (26.6796°S 151.9966°E)
- Pioneer Park (26.6746°S 152.0033°E)

== Attractions ==
A great deal of Nanango's history is preserved in its buildings, especially Ringsfield House (26.6727°S 151.9936°E), a restored circa 1908 Queenslander developed by architect Robin Dods.

The Nanango Country Markets are held on the first Saturday of every month and are widely recognised as the largest rural markets in South-East Queensland.

== Climate ==
The area has a similar climate to nearby Kingaroy, but it is cooler in winter and generally more humid.

Climate data for Nanango
Month	Jan	Feb	Mar	Apr	May	Jun	Jul	Aug	Sep	Oct	Nov	Dec	Year
Record high °C (°F)	40.0 (104.0)	39.3 (102.7)	37.4 (99.3)	34.5 (94.1)	32.0 (89.6)	28.2 (82.8)	26.5 (79.7)	29.6 (85.3)	35.0 (95.0)	37.2 (99.0)	39.9 (103.8)	39.8 (103.6)	40.0 (104.0)
Mean daily maximum °C (°F)	30.4 (86.7)	29.0 (84.2)	27.9 (82.2)	25.5 (77.9)	22.2 (72.0)	19.6 (67.3)	19.3 (66.7)	21.0 (69.8)	23.8 (74.8)	26.8 (80.2)	29.1 (84.4)	30.1 (86.2)	25.4 (77.7)
Mean daily minimum °C (°F)	17.3 (63.1)	17.2 (63.0)	15.4 (59.7)	11.0 (51.8)	6.9 (44.4)	3.8 (38.8)	2.7 (36.9)	3.2 (37.8)	6.5 (43.7)	10.7 (51.3)	14.0 (57.2)	16.1 (61.0)	10.4 (50.7)
Record low °C (°F)	10.4 (50.7)	8.1 (46.6)	6.1 (43.0)	2.8 (37.0)	−3.5 (25.7)	−4.5 (23.9)	−6.7 (19.9)	−5.7 (21.7)	−2.5 (27.5)	−0.3 (31.5)	4.3 (39.7)	5.7 (42.3)	−6.7 (19.9)
Average rainfall mm (inches)	112.5 (4.43)	103.0 (4.06)	82.2 (3.24)	47.7 (1.88)	43.6 (1.72)	42.1 (1.66)	40.9 (1.61)	32.6 (1.28)	39.5 (1.56)	65.4 (2.57)	76.0 (2.99)	104.5 (4.11)	790 (31.11)
Average rainy days (≥ 0.2mm)	9.9	9.6	9.2	6.8	6.6	5.7	5.2	4.7	5.1	6.7	7.9	9.0	86.4
Source: Bureau of Meteorology

== Notable residents ==
- Darcy Ward, an Australian former motorcycle speedway rider
