= Cattle Creek, Queensland (North Burnett Region) =

Cattle Creek
- Suburb
- Interactive map of Cattle Creek
- Coordinates: 25.4663°S 151.3038°E
- Country: Australia
- State: Queensland
- LGA: North Burnett Region
- Location: 13.8 km (8.6 mi) N of Mundubbera; 28.3 km (17.6 mi) SE of Eidsvold; 50.1 km (31.1 mi) WNW of Gayndah; 203 km (126 mi) SW of Bundaberg; 398 km (247 mi) NNW of Brisbane

Government
  - State electorate: Callide
  - Federal division: Flynn

Area
  - Total: 68.5 km^{2} (26.4 sq mi)

Population
  - Total: 13 (2021 census)
  - Density: 0.190/km^{2} (0.492/sq mi)
- Time zone: UTC+10:00 (AEST)
- Postcode: 4626
Suburbs around Cattle Creek
| Eidsvold East | Eidsvold East | Branch Creek |
| Malmoe | Cattle Creek | Gurgeena |
| O'Bil Bil | O'Bil Bil | Mundowran |

Cattle Creek is a rural locality in the North Burnett Region, Queensland, Australia. In the 2021 census, Cattle Creek had a population of 13 people.

== Geography ==
The Burnett Highway forms the southern boundary of the locality, entering from the south-west (Malmoe / O'Bil Bil) and exiting to the south-east (O'Bil Bil / Mundowran).

The watercourse Cattle Creek rises in the north of the locality and flows south, crossing into Mundowran to the south-east where it becomes a tributary of O'Bil Bil Creek.

The land use is almost entirely grazing on native vegetation.

== History ==
O'Bill Bill Creek State School opened in January 1916 as an open air school (a tent-like structure) on a 3 acres (1.2 ha) site. In 1925, it was renamed Cattle Creek Valley State School. It closed on 12 March 1971. It was on the north-eastern side of Cattle Creek School Road (approx 25.49367°S 151.29894°E).

== Demographics ==
In the 2016 census, Cattle Creek had a population of 28 people.

In the 2021 census, Cattle Creek had a population of 13 people.

== Education ==
There are no schools in Cattle Creek. The nearest government primary schools are Mundubbera State College in Mundubbera to the south, Binjour Plateau State School in Binjour to the south-east, and Eidsvold State School in Eidsvold to the north-west. The nearest government secondary schools are Mundubbera State College (to Year 10) and Eidsvold State School to Year 12.
