= Dykehead =

- Suburb
- Interactive map of Dykehead
- Coordinates: 25.6483°S 151.0677°E
- Country: Australia
- State: Queensland
- LGA: North Burnett Region
- Location: 40.5 km (25.2 mi) WSW of Mundubbera; 52.4 km (32.6 mi) SSW of Eidsvold; 73.6 km (45.7 mi) W of Gayndah; 232 km (144 mi) WSW of Hervey Bay; 402 km (250 mi) NE of Brisbane

Government
  - State electorate: Callide
  - Federal division: Flynn

Area
  - Total: 324.7 km^{2} (125.4 sq mi)

Population
  - Total: 0 (2021 census)
  - Density: 0.0000/km^{2} (0.000/sq mi)
- Time zone: UTC+10:00 (AEST)
- Postcode: 4626
Suburbs around Dykehead
Eidsvold West	Coonambula	Riverleigh
Cheltenham	Dykehead	Derri Derra
Hawkwood	Brovinia	Derri Derra

Dykehead is a rural locality in the North Burnett Region, Queensland, Australia. In the 2021 census, Dykehead had "no people or a very low population".

== Geography ==
The Auburn River forms most of the eastern and southern boundaries, while the Burnett River forms a small portion of the eastern. The Dykehead and Auburn State Forests are within the locality. In the south is Auburn River National Park extending across the river into neighbouring Hawkwood.

== Demographics ==
In the 2016 census, Dykehead had a population of 8 people.

In the 2021 census, Dykehead had "no people or a very low population".

== Education ==
There are no schools in Dykehead. The nearest government primary schools are Boynewood State School in Boynewood to the east and Mundubbera State College in Mundubbera to the north-east. The nearest government secondary schools are Mundubbera State College to Year 10 and Eidsvold State School (to Year 12) in Eidsvold to the north.
