= Grosvenor, Queensland =

Grosvenor
- Suburb
- Interactive map of Grosvenor
- Coordinates: 25.4316°S 151.1733°E
- Country: Australia
- State: Queensland
- LGA: North Burnett Region
- Location: 10.0 km (6.2 mi) SE of Eidsvold; 63.0 km (39.1 mi) NW of Gayndah; 190 km (120 mi) WSW of Bundaberg; 401 km (249 mi) NW of Brisbane

Government
  - State electorate: Callide
  - Federal division: Flynn

Area
  - Total: 36.7 km^{2} (14.2 sq mi)

Population
  - Total: 29 (2021 census)
  - Density: 0.790/km^{2} (2.05/sq mi)
- Time zone: UTC+10:00 (AEST)
- Postcode: 4627
Suburbs around Grosvenor
Eidsvold	Eidsvold	Eidsvold East
Eidsvold	Grosvenor	Eidsvold East
Malmoe	Malmoe	Malmoe

Grosvenor is a rural locality in the North Burnett Region, Queensland, Australia. In the 2021 census, Grosvenor had a population of 29 people.

== Geography ==
The locality is bounded to the north-west by Harkness Boundary Creek.

The Burnett River enters the locality from the west (Eidsvold) and exits to the south (Malmoe).

To the east of the river, the Burnett Highway enters the locality from the north (Eidsvold / Eidsvold East) and exits to the south-east (Malmoe).

The land is flatter around the river but undulating to the north and east. The land near the river is mostly used for crop growing, but the predominant land use is grazing on native vegetation.

== History ==
Grosvenor Flat Provisional School opened on 19 September 1892 and closed on 18 March 1908. It reopened on 8 May 1916 as Grosvenor Flat State School but closed in 1926. It was on A Creek Road (25.45457°S 151.17560°E).

The Mungar Junction to Monto railway line opened from Mundubbera to Ceratodus on 26 April 1924 with Grosvenor being served by the Grosvenor railway station (25.4276°S 151.1743°E).

Grosvenor Provisional School opened on 26 January 1932 and closed on 19 April 1940. It was south of the Grosvenor railway station (approx 25.45457°S 151.17560°E).

== Demographics ==
In the 2016 census, Grosvenor had a population of 25 people.

In the 2021 census, Grosvenor had a population of 29 people.

== Heritage listings ==
Grosvenor has a number of heritage-listed sites, including:

- Grosvenor Flat Cemetery, Grosvenor Cemetery Road (25.4550°S 151.1845°E)

== Education ==
There are no schools in Grosvenor. The nearest government primary and secondary school is Eidsvold State School in neighbouring Eidsvold to the north.
