= Mundowran =

- Suburb
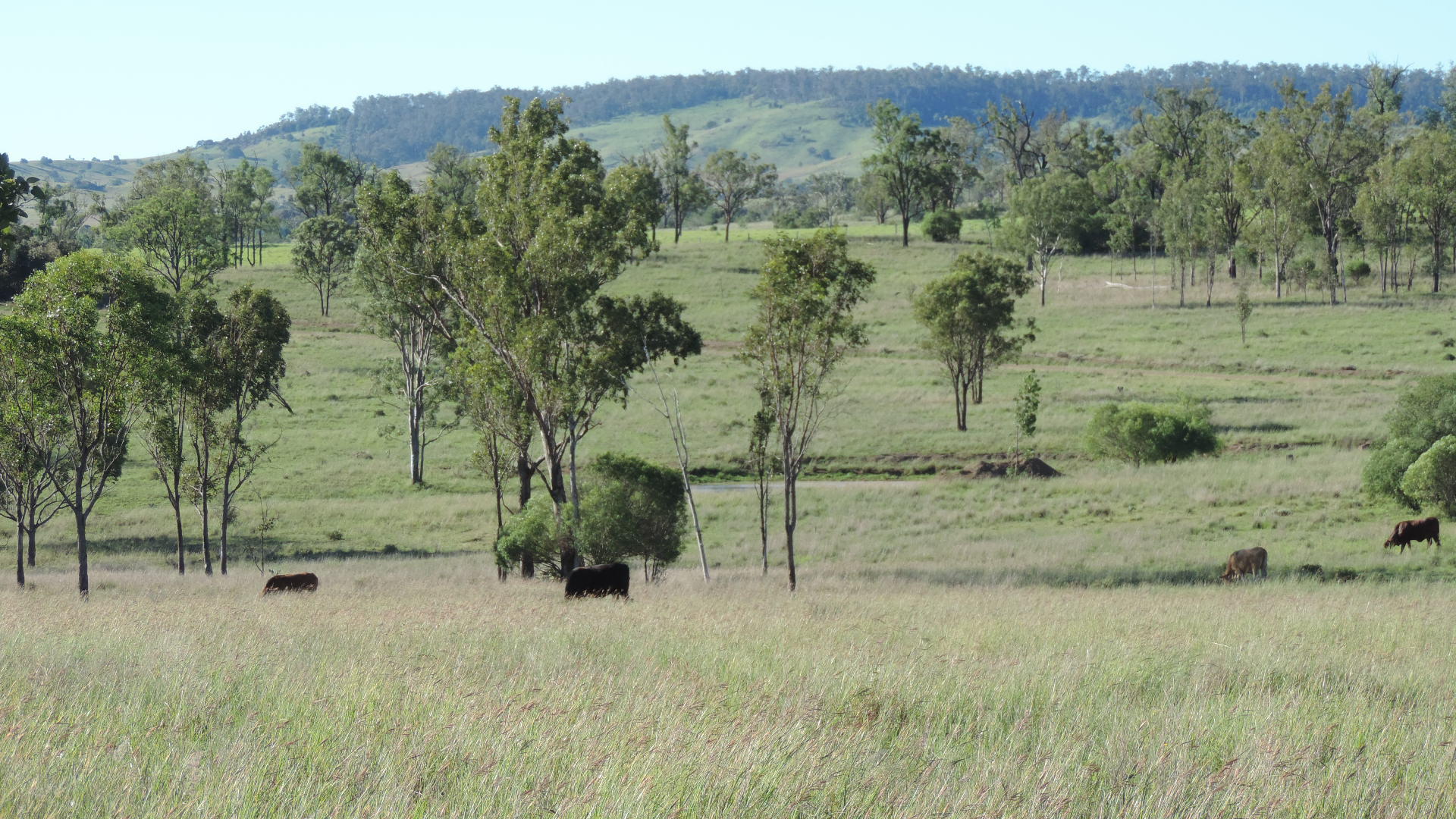
- Rural landscape, 2014

- Interactive map of Mundowran
- Coordinates: 25.5094°S 151.3455°E
- Country: Australia
- State: Queensland
- LGA: North Burnett Region
- Location: 11.7 km (7.3 mi) NE of Mundubbera; 33.8 km (21.0 mi) NW of Gayndah; 44.9 km (27.9 mi) SE of Eidsvold; 181 km (112 mi) SW of Bundaberg; 366 km (227 mi) NNW of Brisbane

Government
  - State electorate: Callide
  - Federal division: Flynn

Area
  - Total: 101.9 km^{2} (39.3 sq mi)

Population
  - Total: 119 (2021 census)
  - Density: 1.168/km^{2} (3.025/sq mi)
- Time zone: UTC+10:00 (AEST)
- Postcode: 4626
Suburbs around Mundowran
Cattle Creek	Cattle Creek	Gurgeena
O'Bil Bil	Mundowran	Philpott
Mundubbera	Philpott	Philpott

Mundowran is a rural locality in the North Burnett Region, Queensland, Australia. In the 2021 census, Mundowran had a population of 119 people.

== Geography ==
The Burnett Highway enters the locality from the east, passes south through a small area, and then forms the south-eastern, southern and south-western boundaries before continuing to the west. The Mundubbera Durong Road (State Route 75) runs south from the Burnett Highway through Mundubbera.

== History ==
Many of the settlers were German.

Mundowran State School opened on 26 March 1913 and closed in 1960. It was at 464 Bald Hills Norris Corner Road (25.53806°S 151.31724°E).

== Demographics ==
In the 2016 census, Mundowran had a population of 122 people.

In the 2021 census, Mundowran had a population of 119 people.

== Education ==
There are no schools in Mundowran. The nearest government primary schools are Mundubbera State College in neighbouring Mundubbera to the south-west and Binjour Plateau State School in Binjour to the east. The nearest government secondary schools are Mundubbera State College (to Year 10) in Mundubbera, Eidsvold State School (to Year 12) in Eidsvold to the north-west, and Burnett State College in Gayndah to the south-east.
