= O'Bil Bil =

- Suburb
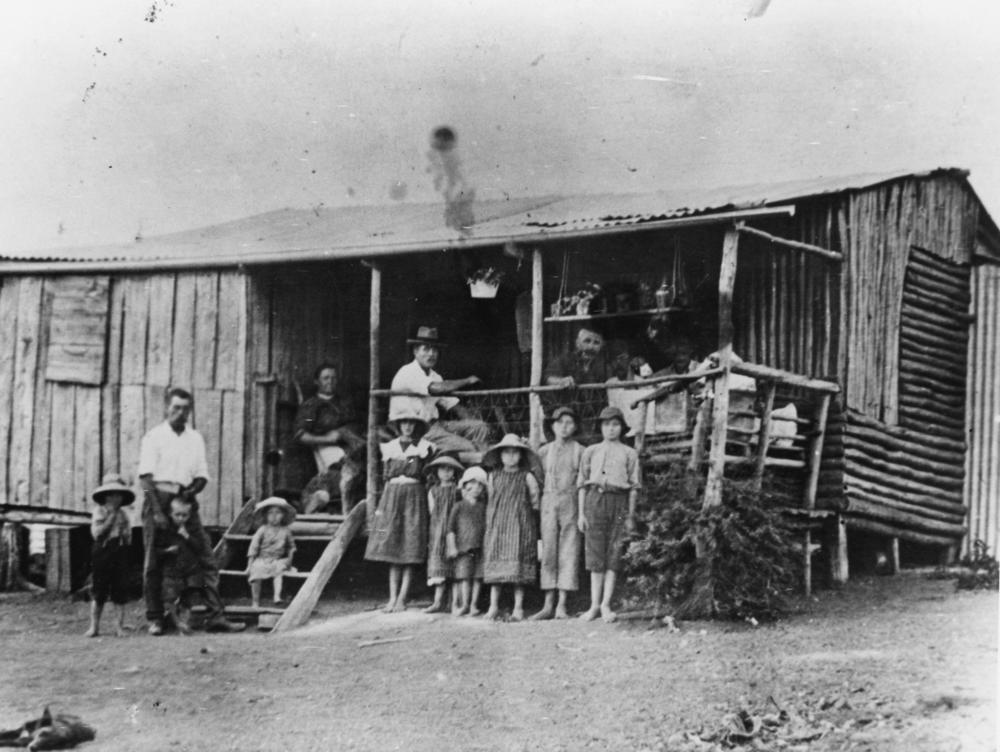
- Kusay family home at O'Bil Bil, 1910

- Interactive map of O'Bil Bil
- Coordinates: 25.5261°S 151.2552°E
- Country: Australia
- State: Queensland
- LGA: North Burnett Region
- Location: 5.7 km (3.5 mi) NNW of Mundubbera; 31.4 km (19.5 mi) SSE of Eidsvold; 42.0 km (26.1 mi) WNW of Gayndah; 195 km (121 mi) SW of Bundaberg; 383 km (238 mi) NW of Brisbane

Government
  - State electorate: Callide
  - Federal division: Flynn

Area
  - Total: 42.0 km^{2} (16.2 sq mi)

Population
  - Total: 28 (2021 census)
  - Density: 0.667/km^{2} (1.73/sq mi)
- Time zone: UTC+10:00 (AEST)
- Postcode: 4626
Suburbs around O'Bil Bil
Malmoe	Malmoe	Cattle Creek
Coonambula	O'Bil Bil	Mundowran
Riverleigh	Mundubbera	Mundubbera

O'Bil Bil is a rural locality in the North Burnett Region, Queensland, Australia. In the 2021 census, O'Bil Bil had a population of 28 people.

== Geography ==
The Burnett River forms the western boundary of the locality, entering from the south-west (Coonambula / Riverleigh) and exiting to the north-west (Coonambula / Malmoe) at its confluence with O'Bil Bil Creek, which forms the north-western boundary of the locality.

The Burnett Highway enters the locality from the north (Malmoe) and then forms the northern and eastern boundaries of the locality before exiting to the south-east (Mundubbera).

The land use is grazing on native vegetation.

== History ==
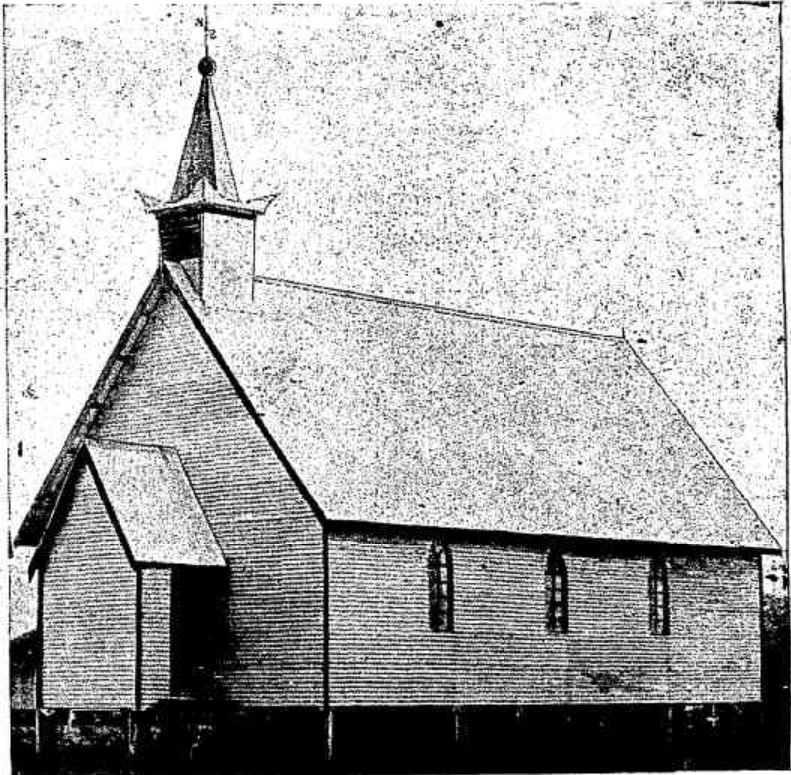
New German Apostolic church, 1913

The locality is named after the O'Bil Bil Creek, a tributary of the Burnett River.

Most of the settlers in the district were Germans.

The Malmoe Apostolic Church opened in 1913, part of the Apostolic Church of Queensland. It was demolished in 1969 to be replaced by a new church building in 1970. The church location is now within the locality of O'Bil Bil.

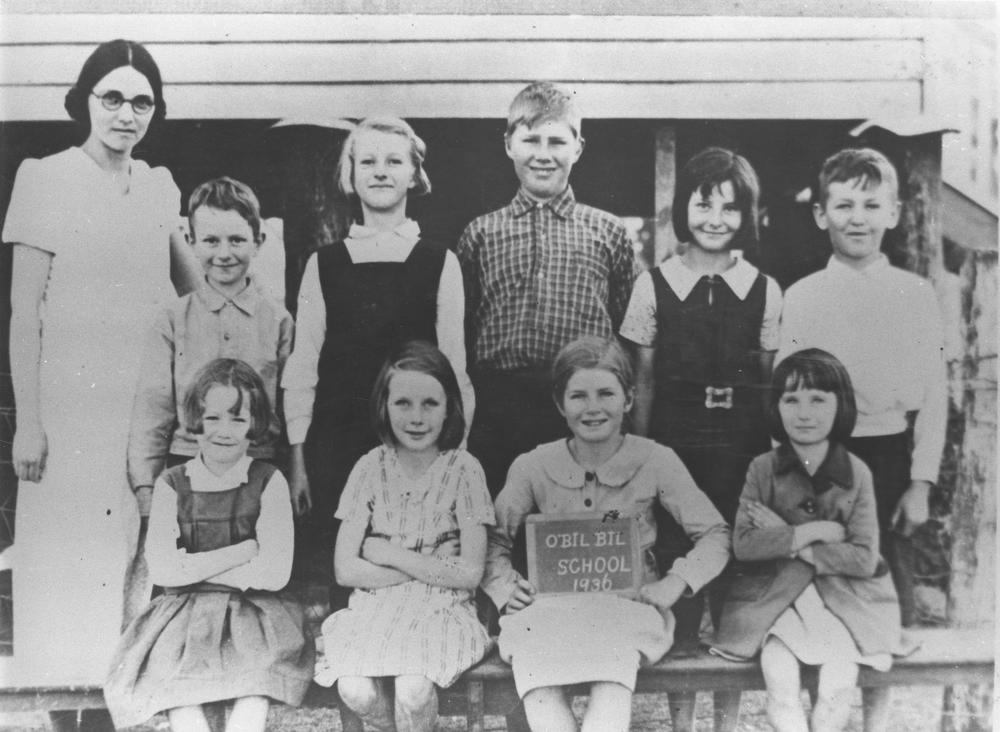
Class photograph of students and teacher from O'Bil Bil school, 1936

Malmoe State School opened in August 1914. It was on the northern side of Augustines Road (25.54282°S 151.23094°E). In 1925, it was relocated to a new site near the O'Bil Bil railway station. In 1928, it was renamed O'Bil Bil State School. It closed circa 1964. It was at 80 O'Bil Bil Road (25.51442°S 151.21442°E).

O'Bill Bill Creek State School opened in January 1916. In 1925, it was renamed Cattle Creek Valley State School. It closed on 12 March 1971. It was on the north-eastern side of Cattle Creek School Road, now within the locality of Cattle Creek (approx 25.49367°S 151.29894°E).

The Mungar Junction to Monto railway line opened from Mundubbera to Ceratodus on 26 April 1924, with the locality served by Obil Bil railway station (25.5190°S 151.2200°E). The last train on the railway line was in 2008 and the line was officially closed in 2012.

== Demographics ==
In the 2016 census, O'Bil Bil had a population of 29 people.

In the 2021 census, O'Bil Bil had a population of 28 people.

== Education ==
There are no schools in O'Bil Bil. The nearest government schools are Mundubbera State College (Prep to Year 10) in neighbouring Mundubbera to the south-east and Eidsvold State School (Prep to Year 12) in Eidsvold to the north-west.

== Amenities ==
Despite the name, the Malmoe Apostolic Church is at 529 Augustines Road in O'Bil Bil (25.54429°S 151.23210°E).
