= Malmoe, Queensland =

Malmoe
- Suburb
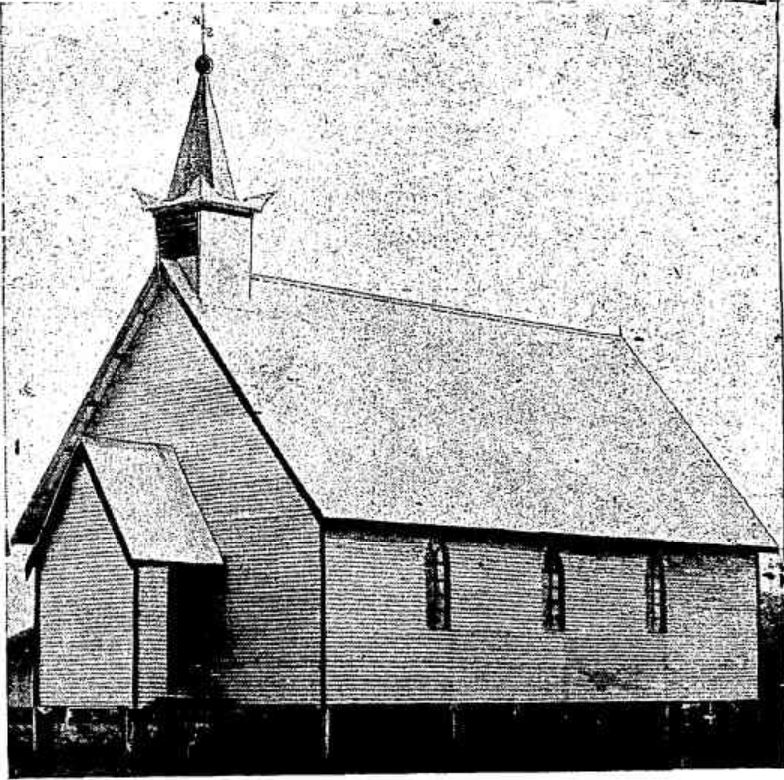
- The new German Apostolic Church at Malmoe, 1913

- Interactive map of Malmoe
- Coordinates: 25.4775°S 151.1886°E
- Country: Australia
- State: Queensland
- LGA: North Burnett Region
- Location: 16.7 km (10.4 mi) SSE of Eidsvold; 19.9 km (12.4 mi) NW of Mundubbera; 56.3 km (35.0 mi) WNW of Gayndah; 197 km (122 mi) WSW of Bundaberg; 385 km (239 mi) NNW of Brisbane

Government
  - State electorate: Callide
  - Federal division: Flynn

Area
  - Total: 55.6 km^{2} (21.5 sq mi)

Population
  - Total: 37 (2021 census)
  - Density: 0.665/km^{2} (1.724/sq mi)
- Time zone: UTC+10:00 (AEST)
- Postcode: 4627
Suburbs around Malmoe
Eidsvold	Grosvenor	Eidsvold East
Eidsvold	Malmoe	Cattle Creek
Coonambula	Coonambula	O'Bil Bil

Malmoe is a rural locality in the North Burnett Region, Queensland, Australia. In the 2021 census, Malmoe had a population of 37 people.

== Geography ==
The Burnett River enters the locality from the north (Grosvenor) and exits to the south (Coonambula / O'Bil Bil), forming a section of the southern boundary of the locality. Two of its tributaries, A Creek and O'Bil Bil Creek form part of the locality's south-western and south-eastern boundaries respectively.

Malmoe has one mountain in the east of the locality, called Spring Hill (25.4813°S 151.2301°E), which rises to 296 metres (971 ft) above sea level.

The Burnett Highway enters the locality from the north (Grosvenor) and exits to the south-east (O'Bil Bil).

The land use is predominantly irrigated crop growing around the Burnett River, but otherwise is grazing on native vegetation.

== History ==
The name Malmoe is derived from the name of a pastoral run name, operated from at least 1848 by the Archer brothers, a family with connections to Scotland and Norway. It is suspected that it refers to the Swedish city of Malmo.

Many of the settlers were German.

The Malmoe Apostolic Church opened in 1913, part of the Apostolic Church of Queensland. It was demolished in 1969 to be replaced by a new church building in 1970. It is now within the locality of O'Bil Bil.

Malmoe State School opened in August 1914. It was on the northern side of Augustines Road (25.54282°S 151.23094°E). In 1925, it was relocated to a new site near the O'Bil Bil railway station. In 1928, it was renamed O'Bil Bil State School. It closed circa 1964. It was at 80 O'Bil Bil Road (25.51442°S 151.21442°E).

The Mungar Junction to Monto railway line opened in stages with the section from Mundubbera to Ceratodus opening on 26 April 1924, with Malmoe railway station serving the locality (25.4778°S 151.2027°E). The last train on the railway line was in 2008 and in 2012 it was announced the line was officially closed; the station is now abandoned.

== Demographics ==
In the 2016 census, Malmoe had a population of 37 people.

In the 2021 census, Malmoe had a population of 37 people.

== Education ==
There are no schools in Malmoe. The nearest government schools are Eidsvold State School (Kindergarten - Year 12) in Eidsvold to the north and Mundubbera State College (Early Childhood - Year 10) in Mundubbera to the south-east.

== Amenities ==
Despite the name, the Malmoe Apostolic Church is at 529 Augustines Road in O'Bil Bil (25.54429°S 151.23210°E).
