= Eidsvold East, Queensland =

Eidsvold East
- Suburb
- Interactive map of Eidsvold East
- Coordinates: 25.3233°S 151.2538°E
- Country: Australia
- State: Queensland
- LGA: North Burnett Region
- Location: 16.5 km (10.3 mi) NE of Eidsvold; 45.1 km (28.0 mi) N of Mundubbera; 81.4 km (50.6 mi) NW of Gayndah; 168 km (104 mi) WSW of Bundaberg; 423 km (263 mi) NW of Brisbane

Government
  - State electorate: Callide
  - Federal division: Flynn

Area
  - Total: 376.4 km^{2} (145.3 sq mi)

Population
  - Total: 27 (2021 census)
  - Density: 0.0717/km^{2} (0.186/sq mi)
- Time zone: UTC+10:00 (AEST)
- Postcode: 4627
Suburbs around Eidsvold East
| Cynthia; Ceratodus | Yarrol | Mungy |
| Eidsvold | Eidsvold East | Branch Creek |
| Grosvenor | Malmoe | Cattle Creek |

Eidsvold East is a rural locality in the North Burnett Region, Queensland, Australia. In the 2021 census, Eidsvold East had a population of 27 people.

== Geography ==
As the name suggests, Eidsvold East is east of the town of Eidsvold.

The Red Mountain is in the south-east of the locality (25.3885°S 151.2773°E), rising to 364 metres (1,194 ft) above sea level.

The Dalgangal State Forest is a protected area in the north-west of the locality. Apart from it, the land use is almost entirely grazing on native vegetation.

== History ==
The name Eidsvold is the name of the pastoral run operated in 1847-48 by Thomas Archer and David Archer, using the name of the town in Norway where Norwegian constitution was signed in 1814. Although originally from Scotland, the Archer family immigrated to Norway prior to immigrating to Queensland.

== Demographics ==
In the 2016 census, Eidsvold East had a population of 20 people.

In the 2021 census, Eidsvold East had a population of 27 people.

== Education ==
There are no schools in Eidsvold. The nearest government primary schools are Eidsvold State School in neighbouring Eidsvold to the west and Mundubbera State College in Mundubbera to the south. The nearest government secondary schools are Eidsvold State School (to Year 12) and Mundubbera State College (to Year 10).
