= Philpott, Queensland =

Philpott
- Suburb
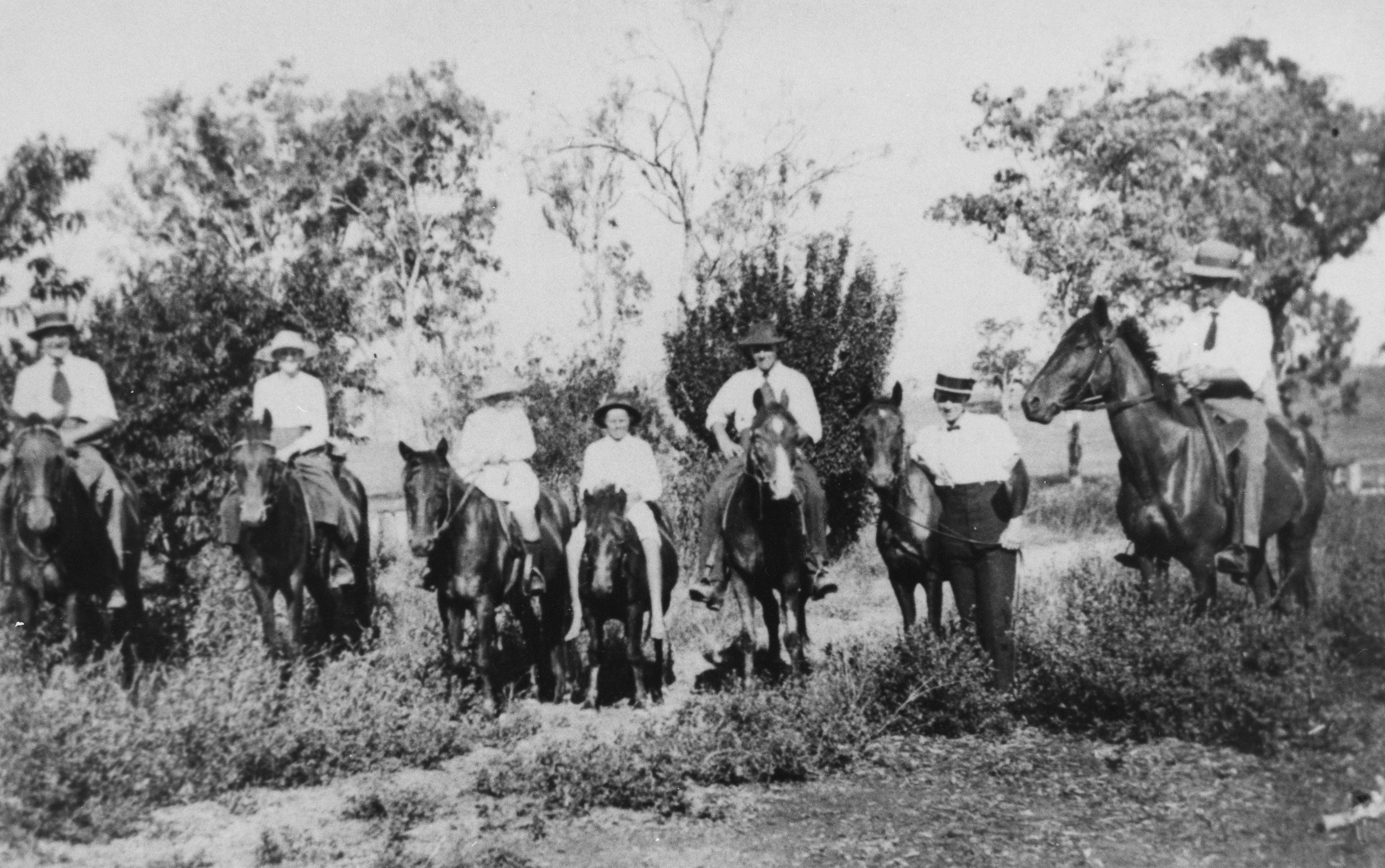
- Bleys Family of Philpott

- Interactive map of Philpott
- Coordinates: 25.5427°S 151.4080°E
- Country: Australia
- State: Queensland
- LGA: North Burnett Region
- Location: 44.1 km (27.4 mi) W of Gayndah; 191 km (119 mi) SW of Bundaberg; 201 km (125 mi) NW of Gympie; 367 km (228 mi) NNW of Brisbane

Government
  - State electorate: Callide
  - Federal division: Flynn

Area
  - Total: 65.4 km^{2} (25.3 sq mi)

Population
  - Total: 32 (2021 census)
  - Density: 0.489/km^{2} (1.267/sq mi)
- Time zone: UTC+10:00 (AEST)
- Postcode: 4626
Suburbs around Philpott
Mundowran	Gurgeena	Binjour
Mundowran	Philpott	Binjour
Mundubbera	Glenrae	Humphery

Philpott is a rural locality in the North Burnett Region, Queensland, Australia. In the 2021 census, Philpott had a population of 32 people.

== Geography ==
The Burnett River forms the southern boundary of the locality, while Philpott Creek forms part of the western boundary.

The Burnett Highway enters the locality from the north-west (Binjour) and exits to the west (Mundowran). It then passes through Mundowran before becoming part of the south-western boundary of Philpott with Mundowran.

Philpott Creek railway station is an abandoned railway station on the former Mungar Junction to Monto railway line (25.5919°S 151.3684°E).

The land use is grazing on native vegetation with a small amount of crop growing.

== History ==
The railway line opened from Humphery (Boomerang railway station) to Mundubbera via Philpott Creek railway station on Monday 2 February 1914.

Philpott Central State School opened on 6 August 1913. It closed circa 1948. It was on a 4-acre (1.6 ha) site off Shallcross Road (25.5883°S 151.3727°E).

The last train on the railway line was in 2008 and in 2012 it was announced the line was officially closed.

== Demographics ==
In the 2016 census, Philpott had a population of 41 people.

In the 2021 census, Philpott had a population of 32 people.

== Education ==
There are no schools in Philpott. The nearest government primary schools are Binjour Plateau State School in neighbouring Binjour to the north-east and Mundubbera State College in neighbouring Mundubbera to the south-west. The nearest government secondary schools are Mundubbera State College (to Year 10), Burnett State College (to Year 12) in Gayndah to the east, and Eidsvold State School (to Year 12) in Eidsvold to the north-west.
