= Branch Creek, Queensland =

Branch Creek
- Suburb
- Interactive map of Branch Creek
- Coordinates: 25.3941°S 151.4344°E
- Country: Australia
- State: Queensland
- LGA: North Burnett Region
- Location: 30.7 km (19.1 mi) NE of Mundubbera; 34.1 km (21.2 mi) E of Eidsvold; 37.2 km (23.1 mi) NW of Gayndah; 184 km (114 mi) SW of Bundaberg; 360 km (220 mi) NNW of Brisbane

Government
  - State electorate: Callide
  - Federal division: Flynn

Area
  - Total: 311.4 km^{2} (120.2 sq mi)

Population
  - Total: 33 (2021 census)
  - Density: 0.1060/km^{2} (0.274/sq mi)
- Time zone: UTC+10:00 (AEST)
- Postcode: 4625
Suburbs around Branch Creek
Eidsvold East	Mungy	Yenda
Cattle Creek	Branch Creek	Yenda
Gurgeena	Binjour	Reids Creek

Branch Creek is a rural locality in the North Burnett Region, Queensland, Australia. In the 2021 census, Branch Creek had a population of 33 people.

== Geography ==
Branch Creek (from which the locality presumably takes its name) rises in the north-west of the locality and flows to the south of the locality where it becomes a tributary to Reid Creek (which was also known as Binjour Creek), which then continues south to Binjour.

== History ==
The bushranger "the Wild Scotchman" was said to have hidden out in the vicinity of Branch Creek and the adjacent Mungy Station in the mid-1860s. The bushranger was said to have visited the Black Horse Hotel which was on the old Gayndah-Dalgangal road where it passed through Branch Creek.

Branch Creek No. 1 was one of the stations that comprised the pastoral run of Ideraway.

Fontainebleau State School opened at Branch Creek on 16 September 1915. It closed in 1964. It was on a 3-acre (1.2 ha) site on the north-eastern side of Binjour Branch Creek Road (25.4182°S 151.4163°E).

== Demographics ==
In the 2016 census, Branch Creek had a population of 32 people.

In the 2021 census, Branch Creek had a population of 33 people.

== Education ==
There are no schools in Branch Creek. The nearest government primary schools are Binjour Plateau State School in neighbouring Binjour to the south and Eidsvold State School in Eidsvold to the west. The nearest government secondary schools are Eidsvold State School (to Year 12) in Eidsvold to the west, Mundubbera State College (to Year 10) in Mundubbera to the south, and Burnett State College (to Year 12) in Gayndah to the south-east.
