= Gurgeena =

- Suburb
- Interactive map of Gurgeena
- Coordinates: 25.4608°S 151.3969°E
- Country: Australia
- State: Queensland
- LGA: North Burnett Region
- Location: 20.8 km (12.9 mi) NE of Mundubbera; 32.8 km (20.4 mi) NW of Gayndah; 54.0 km (33.6 mi) SE of Eidsvold; 180 km (110 mi) SW of Bundaberg; 356 km (221 mi) NNW of Brisbane

Government
  - State electorate: Callide
  - Federal division: Flynn

Area
  - Total: 33.3 km^{2} (12.9 sq mi)

Population
  - Total: 36 (2021 census)
  - Density: 1.081/km^{2} (2.80/sq mi)
- Time zone: UTC+10:00 (AEST)
- Postcode: 4626
Suburbs around Gurgeena
Cattle Creek	Branch Creek	Branch Creek
Cattle Creek	Gurgeena	Branch Creek
Mundowran	Philpott	Binjour

Gurgeena is a rural locality in the North Burnett Region, Queensland, Australia. In the 2021 census, Gurgeena had a population of 36 people.

== Geography ==
Gurgeena is on the Binjour Plateau (25.4602°S 151.3994°E). Land use is principally agricultural and state forest.

The Binjour Range Rest Area, at the top of the range, is near the southern end of the Binjour Plateau. Gurgeena is near the northern end of the plateau.

It is within the Burnett River drainage basin.

== History ==
In 1899 land from Boomerang and Buckingah Stations (parts of the Mt Debateable pastoral lease), and land that had been parts of Mundubbera (Mundowran) and Ideraway Stations comprised the Binjour Plateau. These stations had been in existence for more than 50 years.

The Binjour Plateau was first surveyed by Mr R. W. Winks of the Department of Agriculture, Brisbane, surveying for the proposed Degilbo to Gayndah railway line extension. The purpose of the survey was to find land suitable for agriculture. Closer settlement would yield economic benefits for both the railway and the farmers. His report was laid before the Queensland Parliament on 16 November 1897. At this time the plateau was unnamed. Binjour Station and Reid's Creek were at the foot of the eastern edge of the plateau. Reid's Creek was also known as Binjour Creek.

The plateau was named Mount Murray by the Hon. John Murray, Minister for Railways and Works, when he and others inspected the land in January 1899. In 1899 Mr St John Wood, District-Surveyor, presented another survey specifically on Murray's Plateau to the Surveyor-General. By 1906 the Brisbane Courier reported Murray Plateau "going back to original nomenclature. The name of Binjour, with its native associations, supplants that of Murray in defining the great plateau ... ." At this time it was being opened up for selection as agricultural farms.

Gurgeena State School opened on 7 November 1912 and closed in 1959. The school was on Top Gurgeena Road (25.4593°S 151.3986°E).

== Demographics ==
In the 2016 census, Gurgeena had a population of 35 people.

In the 2021 census, Gurgeena had a population of 36 people.

== Education ==
There are no schools in Gurgeena. The nearest government primary school is Binjour Plateau State School in neighbouring Binjour to the south-east. The nearest government secondary schools are Eidsvold State School (to Year 12) in Eidsvold to the north-west, Mundubbera State School (to Year 10) in Mundubbera to the south-west, and Burnett State College (to Year 12) in Gayndah to the south-east.
