= Branch Creek =

Branch Creek may refer to:

- Branch Creek, Queensland, a locality in North Burnett Region, Queensland, Australia
- East Branch Perkiomen Creek, a creek in Pennsylvania, United States of America
