= Riverleigh =

- Suburb
- Interactive map of Riverleigh
- Coordinates: 25.5844°S 151.2233°E
- Country: Australia
- State: Queensland
- LGA: North Burnett Region
- Location: 9.6 km (6.0 mi) W of Mundubbera; 30.4 km (18.9 mi) SSE of Eidsvold; 46.1 km (28.6 mi) W of Gayndah; 194 km (121 mi) W of Maryborough; 369 km (229 mi) NW of Brisbane

Government
  - State electorate: Callide
  - Federal division: Flynn

Area
  - Total: 60.7 km^{2} (23.4 sq mi)

Population
  - Total: 95 (2021 census)
  - Density: 1.565/km^{2} (4.054/sq mi)
- Time zone: UTC+10:00 (AEST)
- Postcode: 4626
Suburbs around Riverleigh
| Coonambula | O'Bil Bil | O'Bil Bil |
| Coonambula | Riverleigh | Mundubbera |
| Dykehead | Derri Derra | Boynewood |

Riverleigh is a rural locality in the North Burnett Region, Queensland, Australia. In the 2021 census, Riverleigh had a population of 95 people.

== Geography ==
The locality is bounded to the north, west and south by the Burnett River. The land is used for farming.

== History ==
Riverleigh State School opened 15 October 1913. It was mothballed on 31 December 2009 and closed on 31 December 2010. The school was located at 289 Coonambula-Eidsvold Road (25.5855°S 151.2121°E). The school's website was archived.

A Methodist church opened at Riverleigh in 1921. In 1928, it was decided to relocate the church building to be nearer to the state school, with the church being re-opened in the new location on Sunday 21 October 1928.

The Monto railway line was extended to Mundubbera on 3 February 1914. The next stage to Ceratodus which passed through Riverleigh was opened on 26 April 1924, with Riverleigh being served by:

- Lacon railway station (25.6049°S 151.2594°E)
- Riverleigh railway station (25.5751°S 151.2000°E)

Riverleigh Apostolic Church opened on Sunday 27 May 1928 by the Reverend Jacob Dietz. The four-acre site included an earlier church and cemetery.

The last train on the Monto railway line was in 2008 and in 2012 the line was officially closed.

== Demographics ==
In the 2016 census, Riverleigh had a population of 80 people.

In the 2021 census, Riverleigh had a population of 95 people.

== Education ==
There are no schools in Riverleigh. The nearest government school is Mundubbera State School in neighbouring Mundubbera to the east which offers Prep-10 education. For Years 11-12 education, the nearest government school is Eidsvold State School at Eidsvold to the north-west.
