= Kilbirnie Homestead =

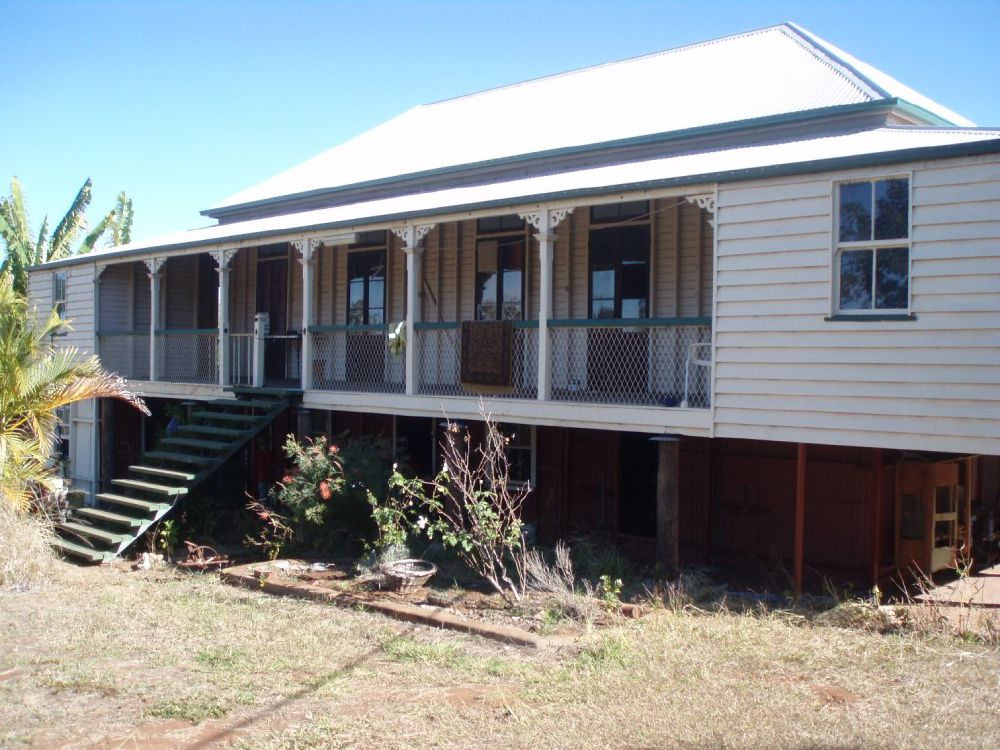
- Kilbirnie Homestead, 2009

- Location within Queensland Location within Australia
- 24.2467°S 150.5056°E
- Location: Argoon-Kilburnie Road, Jambin, Shire of Banana, Queensland, Australia

History
- Design period: 1870s - 1890s (late 19th century)
- Built: 1884

Queensland Heritage Register
- Official name: Kilbirnie Homestead
- Type: state heritage (landscape, built)
- Designated: 21 October 1992
- Reference no.: 600016
- Significant period: 1880s-1900s (historical); 1884-1900s (fabric)
- Significant components: headstone, kitchen/kitchen house, fencing, decorative finishes, residential accommodation - main house, burial/grave, shed/s, grave surrounds/railings

Kilbirnie Homestead is a heritage-listed homestead at Argoon-Kilburnie Road, Jambin, Shire of Banana, Queensland, Australia. It was built in 1884. It was added to the Queensland Heritage Register on 21 October 1992.

== History ==
The buildings comprising Kilbirnie homestead are a series of vernacular timber structures erected by the Campbell family in the 19th and early 20th centuries.

Ludwig Leichhardt explored the Callide and Dawson Valleys in 1844. Thomas Archer took up Eidsvold pastoral run and Charles Archer moved further north settling in the region of what is now Biloela. Other European pastoralists soon followed them in the 1850s, when this district was still a part of New South Wales (as the separation of Queensland did not occur until 1859). In 1869, the Department of Public Lands authorised the opening for selection of land from the runs of Winterbourne and Thalberg on the headwaters of Callide Creek. They were approximately 23 square miles each. A Promise of Lease for the two areas passed quickly through several hands, but in 1877 both runs were leased to Thomas Cadell.

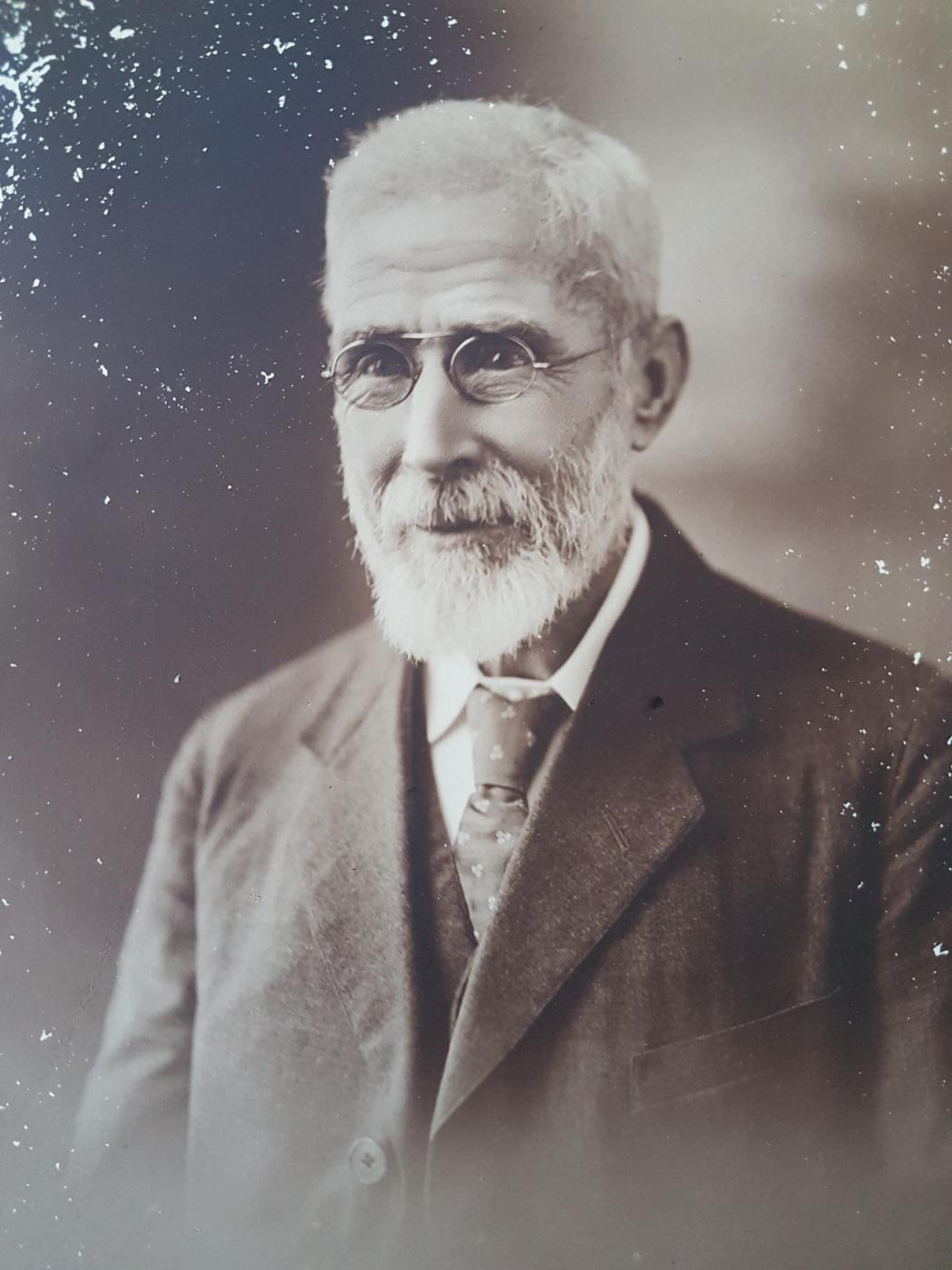
John Campbell, owner of Kilbirnie Homestead, 1910s

Settlement in the area prospered and the service town of Banana was established in the 1860s. In 1880 the Banana Divisional Board was formed. On 12 May 1883 John Campbell applied for a 10-year lease on an area of 12 square miles from the Thalberg run under the Settled Districts Pastoral Leases Act of 1876. Campbell had arrived in Brisbane in 1873 when he was 23 years old. Soon after his arrival, he married his fiancee, Elizabeth Brydges, who had accompanied him from Ireland. After working briefly on a sugar plantation on the Mary River, he obtained a position working as a shepherd and general hand for Robert Bell on Dumgree Station. While working at Dumgree, Campbell obtained sheep of his own and ran them on land rented from Bell. Capital from the sale of these sheep allowed the Campbells to set up their own property.

In 1884 Campbell was granted a 10-year lease for his selected land, which he called Kilburnie. After having prepared the materials needed, he began to construct a six roomed house, stockyard and fences on the land, with help from a bush carpenter named Bryce Kilpatrick. In 1885, when the house was completed, he was able to move his wife and children from Dumgree to their new home. The following year, 6 square miles, being about half of the Kilbirnie run was resumed. Campbell protested this on the grounds that it was unwatered and therefore unsuitable for selection. He was allowed to exercise his right of grazing on the land and in 1889 was offered an Occupation License for the resumed portion and subsequently held occupation licenses for the whole.

Campbell raised cattle and Clydesdale horses at Kilbirnie and by 1892 had constructed stables and other outbuildings and had a horse paddock and a paddock under cultivation. He had also erected about 4 miles (6.4 km) of fencing. The first house had been built directly on the ground and suffered extensive white ant damage, so that it was moved and rebuilt in 1901. It was possibly at this time that the rear of the building was clad in weatherboards. In 1902 a license to erect a hayshed and stockyard and to make a dam was granted. In 1903 a license to erect a house of 12 rooms was approved, the former house being now used as a kitchen wing.

At this time, Kilbirnie was also a coach stop. Until Biloela was founded in 1924, Banana was the main town in the district. From 1897, mail had been delivered to the area by G H (Bob) Fry. By the early 1900s, demand was sufficient for him to operate a 3-seater wagonette, known locally as Fry's mail coach, over the route between Gladstone and Banana. This took two days and the coach stopped at Kilbirnie for morning tea and a change of horses. This service continued until made redundant in 1928.

In 1921 an anomaly was discovered between the land described officially as Kilbirnie and the land actually worked by Campbell. This was resolved in favour of the land in use. In 1924, 9,267 acres (3,750 ha) were resumed in connection with the Burnett Settlement Scheme. At the time the property had grown to 48 square miles by the addition of land held by occupation lease.

Elizabeth Campbell died in 1913 after having had eight children. John Campbell died in 1943 at the age of 98. The house continued in the ownership of family members, although it was unoccupied for some 20 years from the 1970s and an overseer was employed to care for the property. A new generation of family members, great grandchildren of John and Elizabeth Campbell, were later living in the house.

== Description ==
Kilbirnie homestead is close to the Boundary Hill Mine Road and consists of a complex of timber residential and working buildings including a house, detached kitchen and several sheds. The site also has two graves.

The main dwelling is a timber house raised on high timber stumps, which has had rooms built underneath. It has a hipped roof clad in corrugated iron. There is an encircling verandah to the upper level with a separate roof supported on timber posts. Subsidiary L-shaped bedrooms are built into each corner of the verandah so that there is an open section in the centre of each elevation. The handrail across these verandah sections is timber, with steel mesh filling the area below. This upper floor contains a living room, main bedroom and two smaller bedrooms in the core section. Original decorative colour schemes survive and include stencilled stylised iris on the upper walls of the living room and a stencilled dado in the bedroom to the north.

On the ground floor the central section between the stumps is built in with vertical corrugated iron sheeting, creating four rooms including a dining room and storerooms. The area surrounding this core is concreted and serves as a verandah. There is a detached bathroom beside the house at the northwest corner. This is constructed of ripple iron with a curved corrugated iron roof.

To the rear of the house, and connected with it by a covered walkway, is a single storey slab and weatherboard building set on low timber stumps. It has a gabled roof clad in corrugated iron. A verandah runs between two projecting rooms along the long axis of the building facing the house. The rear of the building and the rear portion of the southern end have been clad in weatherboard. This building serves as a detached kitchen building, though it contains other rooms. The kitchen has been extended at the northern end and also into the verandah room on the northeast corner. Internal walls of corrugated iron divide the rest of the building into a store and large nursery room. This room has a series of polychrome stencils of "Japanese" figures and birds applied as a frieze.

The residential buildings are separated from the working buildings by a timber picket fence. There are three sheds surrounding a yard area to the rear of the kitchen building.

The shed on the southern side of the yard has a pole frame and a hipped roof clad in corrugated iron. Two walls are of drop log construction and the building is open on two sides.

The shed to the west of the yard is a rectangular building with a gabled roof and shallow side aisles, the southern side of which is open, the roof being supported by timber posts. The roof is clad in corrugated iron, as is the western wall. It has a pole frame and has walls variously of timber and corrugated iron.

The building to the north of the yard has a gabled roof clad with corrugated iron and has a skillion roofed extension on its northern side. The main part of the building is constructed of dropped slabs with vertical slabs to the extension. The wall on the southern side has gates into the yard and this building may have housed animals.

To the north of the complex are the burials of Elizabeth Campbell, who died in 1913, and of John Campbell, who died in 1943. The graves have matching headstones and are enclosed by decorative iron railing protected by a modern steel pipe enclosure.

== Heritage listing ==
Kilbirnie Homestead was listed on the Queensland Heritage Register on 21 October 1992 having satisfied the following criteria.

The place is important in demonstrating the evolution or pattern of Queensland's history.

Kilbirnie homestead illustrates the pattern of early European exploration and settlement of Queensland where the development of pastoral properties preceded agriculture and the establishment of towns. As an early homestead in the Leichhardt Pastoral District, which has remained in use, it has associations with the development of the pastoral industry in Queensland.

The place is important in demonstrating the principal characteristics of a particular class of cultural places.

Kilbirnie homestead complex provides a record of an evolving pastoral property from the slab buildings of first settlement in the 1880s to a comfortable house of sawn timber. It demonstrates the principal characteristics of such a homestead group well, comprising a main house with detached kitchen, associated outbuildings, graves and fences and illustrates the building techniques traditionally used for these.

The place has a special association with the life or work of a particular person, group or organisation of importance in Queensland's history.

Kilbirnie homestead has a special association with the life and work of four generations of the Campbell family who, as early pastoralists, contributed to the development of the area.
