= Coonambula, Queensland =

Coonambula
- Suburb
- Interactive map of Coonambula
- Coordinates: 25.5427°S 151.0927°E
- Country: Australia
- State: Queensland
- LGA: North Burnett Region
- Location: 27.4 km (17.0 mi) WNW of Mundubbera; 34.0 km (21.1 mi) SSW of Eidsvold; 64 km (40 mi) WNW of Gayndah; 221 km (137 mi) NW of Gympie; 390 km (240 mi) NNW of Brisbane

Government
  - State electorate: Callide
  - Federal division: Flynn

Area
  - Total: 256.6 km^{2} (99.1 sq mi)

Population
  - Total: 80 (2021 census)
  - Density: 0.312/km^{2} (0.81/sq mi)
- Time zone: UTC+10:00 (AEST)
- Postcode: 4626
Suburbs around Coonambula
Eidsvold West	Eidsvold	Malmoe
Eidsvold West	Coonambula	O'Bil Bil
Dykehead	Dykehead	Riverleigh

Coonambula is a rural locality in the North Burnett Region, Queensland, Australia. In the 2021 census, Coonambula had a population of 80 people.

== Geography ==
The locality is bounded to the east by the Burnett River.

The land use is predominantly grazing on native vegetation.

== History ==
Bilburie State School opened on 15 February 1931. It closed in 1938. It was on the western side of A Creek Road (approx 25.55646°S 151.18164°E).

== Demographics ==
In the 2016 census, Coonambula had a population of 70 people.

In the 2021 census, Coonambula had a population of 80 people.

== Education ==
There are no schools in the locality. The nearest government schools are Mundubbera State College (Early Childhood to Year 10) in Mundubbera to the east and Eidsvold State School (Prep to Year 12) in neighbouring Eidsvold to the north.
