= Auburn River National Park =

National park in Australia

- IUCN category II (national park)
- Location within Queensland
- Location: Queensland
- Nearest city: Mundubbera
- Coordinates: 25°43′18″S 151°03′07″E
- Area: 3.9 km^{2} (1.5 sq mi)
- Established: 1964
- Governing body: Queensland Parks and Wildlife Service
- Website: http://www.nprsr.qld.gov.au/parks/auburn-river

Auburn River National Park is a protected area in the North Burnett Region, Queensland, Australia. It is in the north-east of the locality of Hawkwood extending into southern Dykehead.

== Geography ==
The park is 277 km northwest of Brisbane. The park is located on the Auburn River, a tributary of the Burnett River, south-west of Mundubbera.

Auburn River National Park was established in 1964 and features a steep river gorge and hardwood forests. It contains some relics from a brief, unsuccessful goldrush in the late 19th century. Many species of birds, reptiles and mammals, such as the vulnerable brush-tailed rock-wallaby, live in habitats along the riverbank.

Camping is allowed on the northern banks of the river at a campground where some facilities are provided. Bush camping is also permitted.

Access is via Mundubbera-Durong Road.

== Walking tracks ==
The following walking tracks commence from the Auburn River Camping Area:

Track name	Class	Distance (return)		Estimated duration	Notes
Track name	Class	km	mi	Estimated duration	Notes
Gorge Lookout Walk	3	0.6	0.37	15 minutes	
Riverbed and Rockpools Trail	4	1.5	0.93	60 minutes	
Gorge-top Walk	3	3.2	2.0	90 minutes	

== See also ==
- Protected areas of Queensland
- Auburn River Dam
