= Binjour =

- Suburb
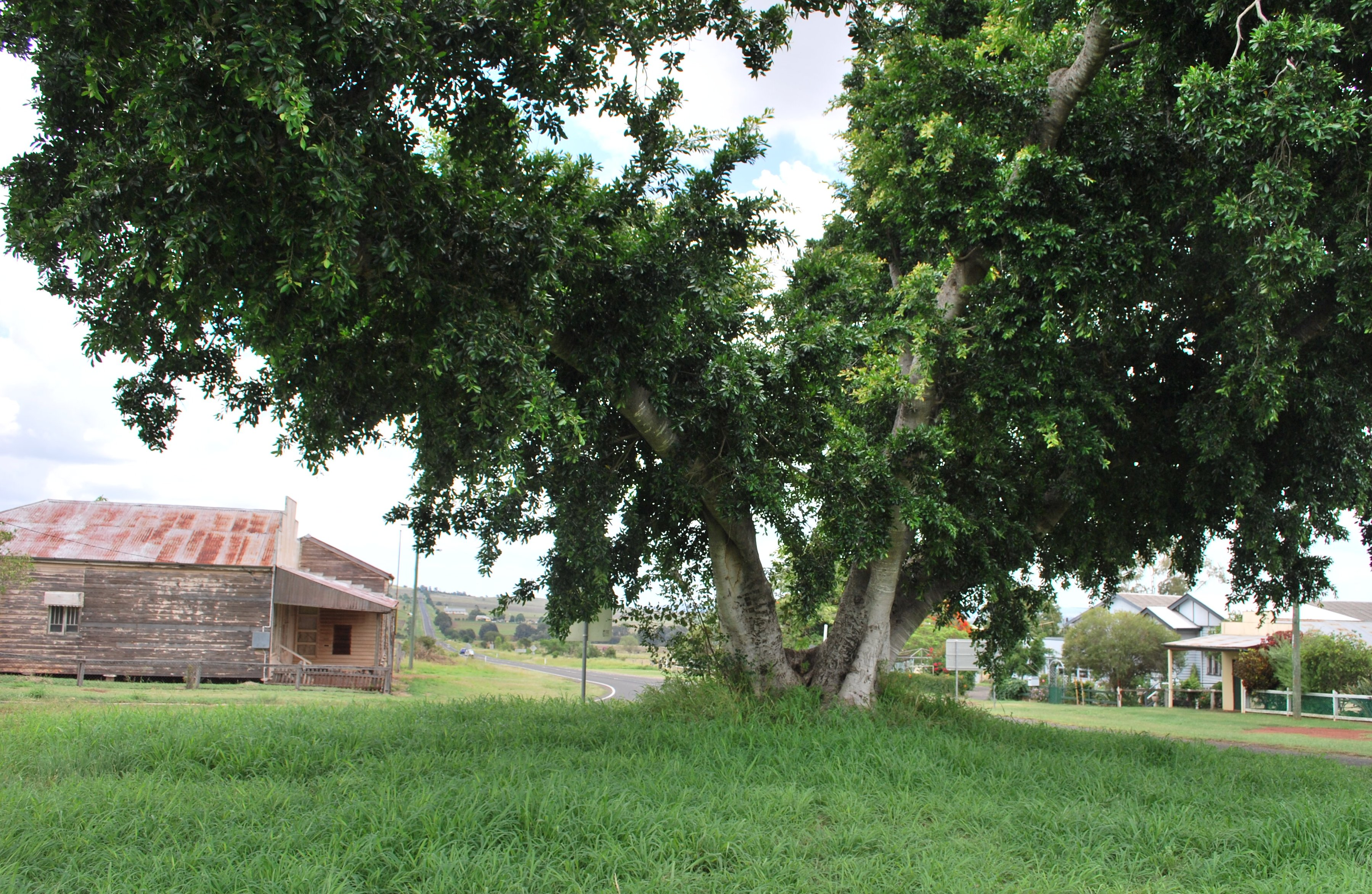
- The Burnett Highway passing through Binjour, seen through a tree. The former general store can be seen to the left

- Interactive map of Binjour
- Coordinates: 25.5344°S 151.4691°E
- Country: Australia
- State: Queensland
- LGA: North Burnett Region
- Location: 22.3 km (13.9 mi) ENE of Mundubbera; 24.3 km (15.1 mi) NW of Gayndah; 173 km (107 mi) SW of Bundaberg; 349 km (217 mi) NW of Brisbane

Government
  - State electorate: Callide
  - Federal division: Flynn

Area
  - Total: 82.3 km^{2} (31.8 sq mi)

Population
  - Total: 86 (2021 census)
  - Density: 1.045/km^{2} (2.706/sq mi)
- Time zone: UTC+10:00 (AEST)
- Postcode: 4625
Suburbs around Binjour
Gurgeena	Branch Creek	Reids Creek
Philpott	Binjour	Reids Creek
Philpott	Humphery	Humphery

Binjour is a rural locality in the North Burnett Region, Queensland, Australia. In the 2021 census, Binjour had a population of 86 people.

== Geography ==
Binjour is in the Wide Bay-Burnett region on the Burnett Highway 349 kilometres (217 mi) by road north of the state capital, Brisbane.

The Binjour Range Rest Area, at the top of the range, is near the southern end of the Binjour Plateau. Gurgeena is near the northern end of the plateau.

The Burnett Highway passes through the locality from east to west. It is within the Burnett River drainage basin.

== History ==
The Binjour Plateau was first surveyed by Mr R. W. Winks of the Department of Agriculture, Brisbane, surveying for the proposed Degilbo to Gayndah railway line extension. The purpose of the survey was to find land suitable for agriculture. Closer settlement would yield economic benefits for both the railway and the farmers. His report was laid before the Queensland Parliament on 16 November 1897. At this time the plateau was unnamed. Binjour Station and Reid's Creek were at the foot of the eastern edge of the plateau. Reid's Creek was also known as Binjour Creek.

In 1899, land from Boomerang and Buckingah Stations (parts of the Mt Debateable pastoral lease), and land that had been parts of Mundubbera (Mundowran) and Ideraway Stations comprised the Binjour Plateau. These stations had been in existence for more than 50 years.

The plateau was named Mount Murray by the Hon. John Murray, Minister for Railways and Works, when he and others inspected the land in January 1899. In 1899, Mr St John Wood, District-Surveyor, presented another survey specifically on Murray's Plateau to the Surveyor-General. By 1906, the Brisbane Courier reported Murray Plateau "going back to original nomenclature. The name of Binjour, with its native associations, supplants that of Murray in defining the great plateau ... ." At this time it was being opened up for selection as agricultural farms. Many of the settlers were German.

On 15 April 1911, the community requested a school be established. Their request was approved on 24 July 1911. Tenders were called to erect the school building in February 1912 with the tender of Mr A. F. Bates for £320 10s accepted in May 1912. In July 1912, the Queensland Government reserved 4 acres (1.6 ha) of land for the school. A school building was relocated from Wondai and extended with a rear verandah. The resultant building was 42 by 14 feet (12.8 by 4.3 m) instead with 7-foot (2.1 m) wide verandahs front and rear. The school opened on 15 September 1913 under head teacher John Woodcock. By 26 September 1913 there were 29 pupils, increasing to 37 by the end of the year. As many of the settlers in the area were German, many of the children could not speak English.

Gleneden State School opened on 19 December 1913 and closed on 22 May 1953. It was on a 5-acre (2.0 ha) site at 1028 Humphery Binjour Road (25.5588°S 151.4612°E).

== Demographics ==
In the 2016 census, Binjour had a population of 98 people.

In the 2021 census, Binjour had a population of 86 people.

== Heritage listings ==
Binjour has a number of heritage-listed sites:

- Church Road (25.5119°S 151.4377°E): Binjour Apostolic Cemetery
- Redvale Road (corner of Burnett Highway, 25.5305°S 151.4277°E): Binjour Cemetery

== Education ==
Binjour Plateau State School is a government primary (Prep–6) school for boys and girls at 18401 Burnett Highway (25.5157°S 151.4566°E). In 2016, the school had an enrolment of 16 children with 3 teachers (1 full-time equivalent) and 6 non-teaching staff (2 full-time equivalent). In 2018, the school had an enrolment of 12 students with 3 teachers (1 full-time equivalent) and 6 non-teaching staff (2 full-time equivalent).

There are no secondary schools in Binjour. The nearest government secondary schools are Mundubbera State School (to Year 10) in Mundubbera to the south-west and Burnett State College (to Year 12) in Gayndah to the south-east.

== Amenities ==
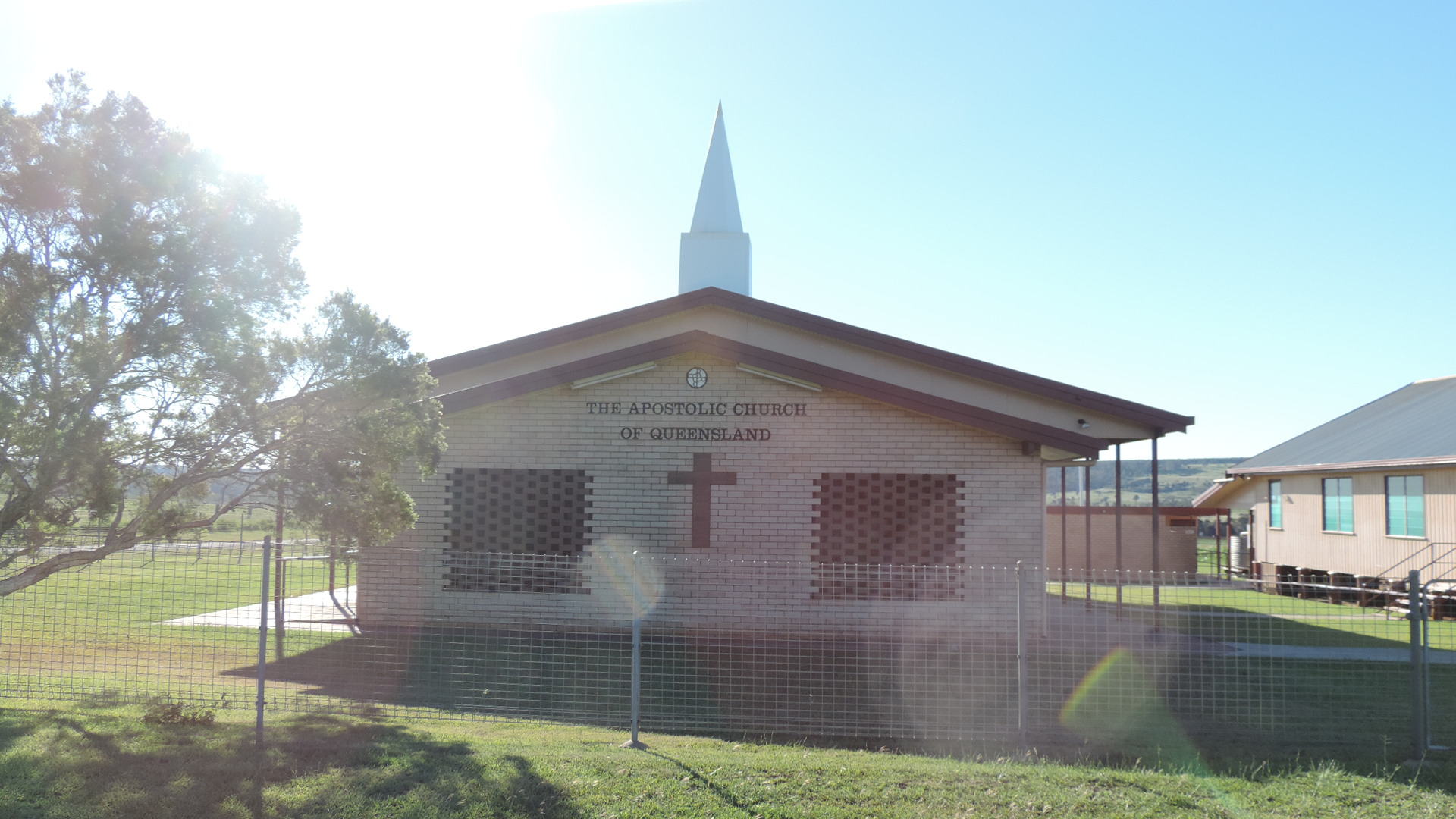
Apostolic Church on the Burnett Highway, 2014

Binjour Apostolic Church is at 125 Church Road (junction with Burnett Highway, 25.5199°S 151.4442°E).
