= Eidsvold Homestead =

Heritage-listed homestead

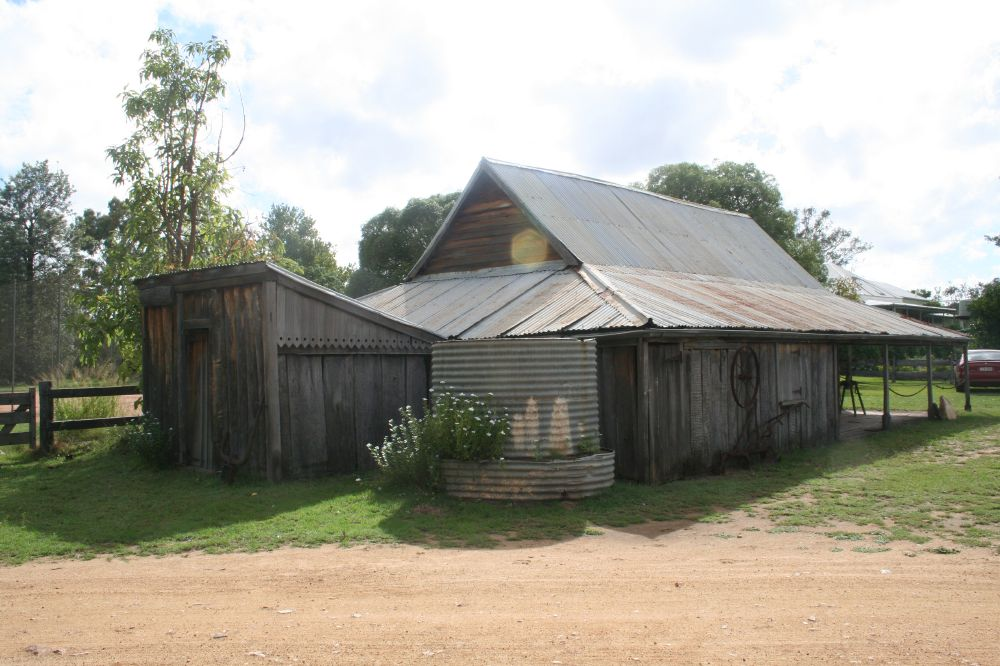
- Eidsvold Homestead, 2009

- Location within Queensland Location within Australia
- 25.3769°S 151.0819°E
- Location: Eidsvold Road, Eidsvold, North Burnett Region, Queensland, Australia

History
- Design period: 1840s–1860s (mid-19th century)
- Built: 1850

Queensland Heritage Register
- Official name: Eidsvold Homestead
- Type: state heritage (built, landscape)
- Designated: 21 October 1992
- Reference no.: 600489
- Significant period: 1850s (historical); 1850s (slab hut fabric); 1880s–1920s (second house fabric); 1967 (1967 house fabric)
- Significant components: residential accommodation – main house, store/s / storeroom / storehouse, garden/grounds, driveway, tennis court, hut/shack, tank stand

Eidsvold Homestead is a heritage-listed homestead at Eidsvold Road, Eidsvold, North Burnett Region, Queensland, Australia. It was built in 1850. It was added to the Queensland Heritage Register on 21 October 1992.

== History ==
Eidsvold Homestead established in 1850 by the Archer family, a well-known family of early Queensland pastoralist explorers. It is one of the earliest homesteads in Queensland and one of the first homesteads in the Burnett region. The homestead complex is an agglomeration of many built structures of disparate architectural styles and from different eras is typical of the way in which homesteads evolved.

The original slab hut which may date to 1850, is a particularly good example of the earliest type of station housing. It may have been built by the Archers themselves. The Archer brothers had emigrated from Tolderodden in Norway and the youngest brother, Colin Archer, later returned home and became a world famous boatbuilder.

A "second" home, forming part of a complex of several buildings commenced in the late nineteenth century, is an example of the housing type that prevailed, at the time, on more established properties in Western Queensland. It has a central core of rooms that opens to wide verandas via French doors. Vine covered trellises extend the veranda roof to provide added shade and coolness.

Francis Ivory, a member of the Queensland Legislative Council, resided on the property in this late 19th century home. The first golf known to be played in Queensland involved Francis Ivory and his brother Alexander Ivory, who laid out a few holes on the property in the 1880s.

A detached building was erected along this building's eastern veranda between the first and second world wars. It is built in the popular Queensland Bungalow style of the 1920s and 1930s.

The property is also significant as the station on which the well-known and successful Santa Gertrudis breed of cattle was first introduced to Australia in 1955.

In 1967, the architect-designed homestead, is a product of the more prosperous later years of the station. It is an example of the work of prominent Queensland-born architect, Guildford Bell.

== Description ==
Eidsvold Homestead today is a complex of buildings set in established gardens. The 1848 slab house is located at the western end of the homestead yard; the complex of buildings which form the second house are situated in the centre; and the 1967 house is at the eastern end. The property is situated on the Burnett River and is approached from the town of Eidsvold via a bridge across this river. The entrance drive sweeps in from the southwest, veering east along the southern perimeter of the main homestead yard and north to the outbuildings.

=== Slab house ===
The 1850s slab house, probably built by the Archer brothers, is the earliest house within the homestead yard. It is located adjacent to the south-western end of an early tennis court, which is surfaced with ant bed and enclosed by a high chain-wire fence. The slab building is in an excellent state of repair. It is rectangular in plan with a central core of rooms enclosed by vertical timber slab walls and surrounded by a wide verandah, which is enclosed along all but the south-eastern corner. The central core has a steeply pitched gabled roof while the surrounding verandah has a shallower pitched skillion roof. The house has a corrugated galvanised iron roof but was previously clad with shingles. These are visible on the underside of the roof. At the western end of the house a tank and a small structure which could be a kitchen or wash-house are located outside the verandah edge. The house and verandah have a wooden floor. Internally the house is furnished in the manner of a residence in the latter half of the 19th century. It functions primarily as a house museum.

=== The second homestead ===
The second homestead comprises a complex of five buildings, which are located to the west/south-west of the 1967 dwelling. Three of these structures are connected with stairs or covered ways. The buildings exhibit a variety of size, scale and architectural styles, reflecting the development of the complex over a number of years.

The core of this complex is a c. 1880s/1890s house with a steeply pitched hipped roof and stepped surrounding verandahs. The building is rectangular in plan, with its long axis running north-east to south-west. A central core of rooms is roofed with galvanised corrugated iron. The wide verandahs surrounding this central core are separately roofed at a lower pitch. A number of French doors open onto these verandahs. The house is elevated on stumps approximately 1,500 to 1,800 millimetres (59 to 71 in) above ground level. It is open underneath and access is provided via a staircase on the southern corner. Verandah railings are limited to a timber rail at around 900 millimetres (35 in) above the floor level with an infilling of mesh over which a creeper has grown. The house is extensively clothed in a range of creepers climbing over trellises from ground level, particularly on the south-western and north-eastern corners. Also on the south-western corner a vine covered trellis extends from the verandah head beam. This extension of the width of the verandah roof with vine covered trellises was typical of house construction in the latter years of the nineteenth century as residents strove to shade and cool their living areas.

Attached to this house along its eastern verandah is a substantial extension elevated a similar height above the ground which appears from its architectural detail to have been built between the first and second world wars. The conjoining of these structures of two distinctly different architectural styles typifies the continuing pragmatic realities of life in the relatively isolated communities of western Queensland's grazing lands

This addition is built in the interwar "Queensland Bungalow" style. Rectangular in plan also, its ridge line runs at right angles to that of the late 19th century house. Again the roof shape is hipped but not at so steep a pitch. An open front verandah runs along the south- western elevation terminated by an enclosed room which runs the full width of the south-eastern elevation. A similar verandah runs along the north-western elevation but this verandah is enclosed with mesh fixed to a timber frame. Both verandahs have separate skillion roofs of galvanised corrugated iron along the full length of the long axis of this extension. A bay window extension fully fenestrated with casement windows is located centrally in the south-eastern elevation. Further sets of casement windows are set one on each side of this bay extension and are shaded by separate sunhoods. The external cladding to this house is chamfer boards. The stumps under are now concrete with decorative scalloped battened sections infilling between the perimeter stumps. Typical of this style of house, gardens are set around the perimeter of the house under the edge of the floor and are partially shaded from the worst of the heat of the sun by the decorative battening between the posts. The vines on the trellises of the colonial house merge with a dense cover of creeper along the north-eastern elevation of the extension. An elevated tank stand is positioned at the southern corner of this house, again with a garden underneath it.

The other buildings in this complex are low-set single gable buildings clad with weatherboard and roofed with corrugated galvanised iron sheeting. The larger of these buildings also have extended verandah skillions as part of their roof forms. The first of these buildings, now used as an office, sits to the front of the elevated complex and towards the western corner. It is rectangular in shape and has a moderately pitched open-ended gable roof with the ridge line along a south-east to north-west axis. A lower section of roof is located on the eastern end of the building. A veranda at ground level is located at the opposite corner. It has a substantial flagstone path leading from it. It is not physically connected to the rest of the building complex.

To the rear (north-west) of the 19th century house are a further two smaller structures, both aligned south-east to north-west. Both are clad in weatherboards and are gable roofed. A verandah at the southern corner of the larger structure is connected via a covered walkway and stair to the colonial house. There is another small verandah on the opposite (northern) corner of this building. A small simple building, now used as a laundry, is located close to this corner but is detached from the group.

The buildings are nestled within a canopy of mature shady trees with extensive shrub and ground cover under-planting. An old bottle tree, Brachychiton rupestre, grows among this vegetation.

=== The 1967 residence ===
The 1967 residence is the most easterly of the structures in the complex. It is set behind a semicircular pathway which defines the edge of its front garden. The house is a low set construction, rectangular in plan, raised three steps above ground level and clad with vertical timber planking with a natural finish. This is reminiscent in character of the first slab hut on the property. Ventilation is achieved using floor to ceiling door and window openings, some louvred. The roof is low pitched in a simple open gable form with the ridge running along the length of the rectangular plan. The semicircular pathway in front of the house edges a well maintained lawn area in which is located a raised concrete edged pond. The surface of the pond is covered with a variety of water plants and large ornamental rocks are arranged within the pond.

=== Ancillary structures ===
To the west of the main homestead complex there is a line of trees which screens the view to the working structures of the station property from the residential area. These working buildings include a number of older buildings such as stables and yards fenced with slip rail fencing. These are not included within the heritage register boundary. Behind this complex again a line of established shady trees encloses the western boundary of this space. Beyond this are a number of more modern structures, including men's quarters and sheds.

== Heritage listing ==
Eidsvold Homestead was listed on the Queensland Heritage Register on 21 October 1992 having satisfied the following criteria.

The place is important in demonstrating the evolution or pattern of Queensland's history.

As one of the earliest homesteads in Queensland and one of the first homesteads in the Burnett region, the Eidsvold Homestead is important in illustrating the pattern and nature of pastoral settlement in this district.

The place is important in demonstrating the principal characteristics of a particular class of cultural places.

The homestead complex contains examples of housing from three stages of station development.

The place is important because of its aesthetic significance.

The homestead complex has aesthetic importance as a picturesque and rustic place set in a rural environment.

The place has a special association with the life or work of a particular person, group or organisation of importance in Queensland's history.

The homestead is associated with the Archer brothers, Francis Ivory, and the introduction of Santa-Gertrudis cattle.
