= Ceratodus, Queensland =

Ceratodus
- Town
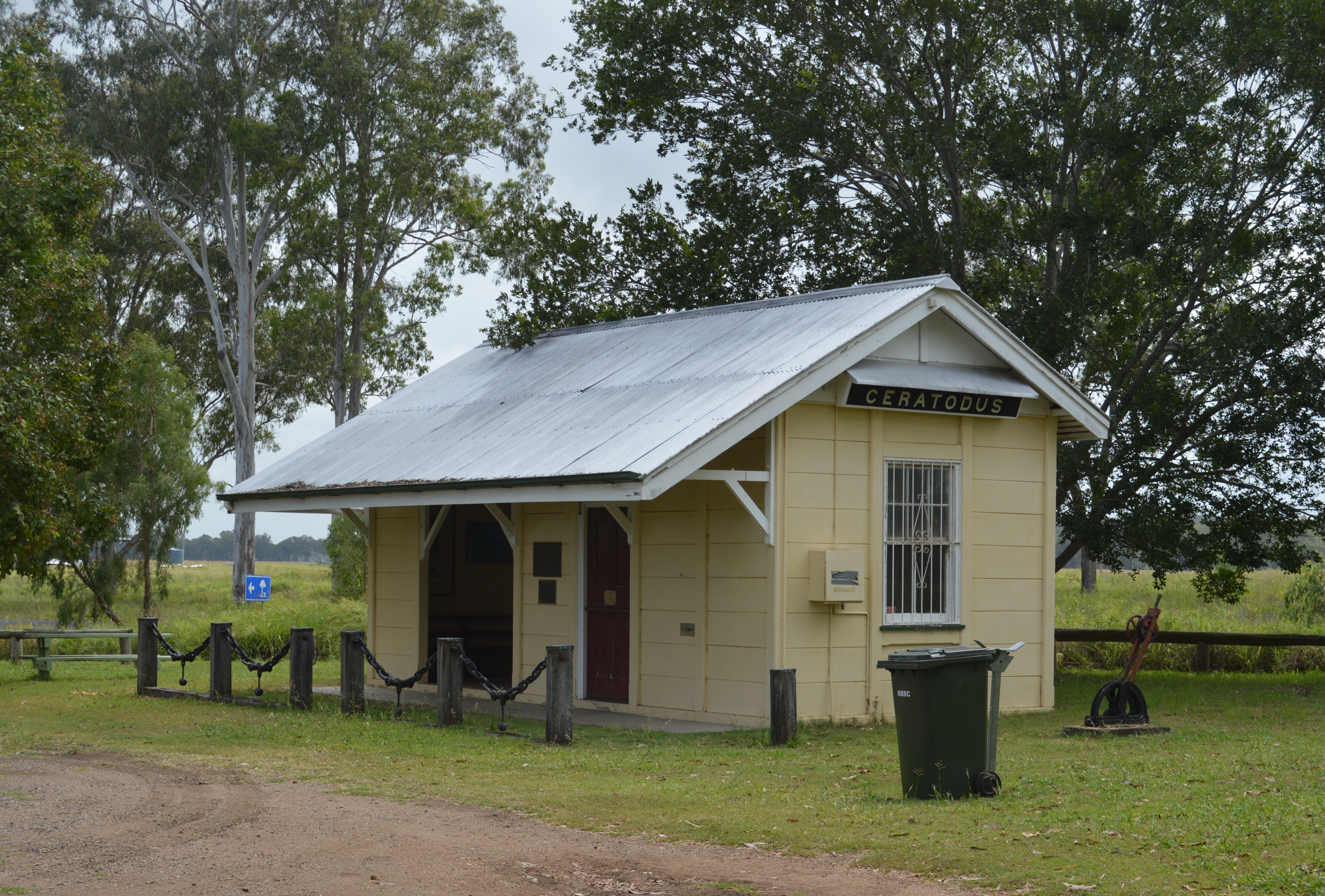
- The former Ceratodus railway station, relocated in 1997 to the Burnett Highway rest area; 2017

- Interactive map of Ceratodus
- Coordinates: 25.2894°S 151.1438°E
- Country: Australia
- State: Queensland
- LGA: North Burnett Region
- Location: 10.2 km (6.3 mi) N of Eidsvold; 82.9 km (51.5 mi) NW of Gayndah; 170 km (110 mi) SWS of Bundaberg; 412 km (256 mi) NNW of Brisbane

Government
  - State electorate: Callide
  - Federal division: Flynn

Area
  - Total: 92.7 km^{2} (35.8 sq mi)

Population
  - Total: 34 (2021 census)
  - Density: 0.367/km^{2} (0.950/sq mi)
- Time zone: UTC+10:00 (AEST)
- Postcode: 4627
Localities around Ceratodus
Wuruma Dam	Cynthia	Eidsvold East
Eidsvold	Ceratodus	Eidsvold East
Eidsvold	Eidsvold	Eidsvold East

Ceratodus /sɛrəˈtoʊdəs/ is a rural town and locality in the North Burnett Region, Queensland, Australia. In the 2021 census, the locality of Ceratodus had a population of 34 people.

== Geography ==
Ceratodus is on the Burnett River about 8.8 kilometres (5.5 mi) from Eidsvold, Queensland. The river flows from north-east to south-west, where it is joined by the Nogo River. The Burnett Highway enters the locality from the north (Cynthia) and exits to the south (Eidsvold).

The land use is predominantly grazing on native vegetation with some production forestry and crop growing in the east of the locality near the Burnett River.

== History ==
The town takes its name from the railway station, which in turn was named on 4 October 1923 from the Queensland lungfish, Neoceratodus forsteri, originally only found in the Burnett River and the Mary River.

A railway station on the Mungar Junction to Monto railway line opened here 26 April 1924. On 12 September 1924, the District Postal Inspector, Maryborough Division, reported that 100 railway employees were camped at Ceratodus, engaged on bridge building and other railway work, and that there was one permanent settler (named Falconer) in the locality.

Ceratodus Provisional School was open from 1925 to 1927. Ceratodus State School opened in July 1930 using the school building relocated from Towns Creek (near Mount Perry). The school closed on 10 October 1965.

Nogo River Junction State School opened on 4 July 1927 and closed circa 1941. It was on Nogo River Road on the eastern bank of the Nogo River at its junction with the Burnett River (approx 25.27774°S 151.07209°E).

A receiving office opened at the railway station in January 1925 and was elevated to a post office by April 1926.

The settlement was, for many years, a watering station for steam locomotives. In 1967 it was reported that the postmistress and station-mistress (Mrs J. Leard) also operated the telephone exchange (to which only one subscriber's service was connected) and that there were no shops or businesses in the settlement, only two railway cottages. The post office closed 31 May 1968.

== Demographics ==
In the 2016 census, the locality of Ceratodus had a population of 28 people.

In the 2021 census, the locality of Ceratodus had a population of 34 people.

== Heritage listings ==
Ceratodus has a number of heritage-listed sites, including:

- Ceratodus Rest Area, Burnett Highway (25.28178°S 151.13924°E)

== Education ==
There are no schools in Ceratodus. The nearest government schools are Eidsvold State School (Kindergarten to Year 12) in neighbouring Eidsvold to the south and Abercorn State School (Prep to Year 6) in Abercorn to the north.
