= Eidsvold, Queensland =

Eidsvold
- Town
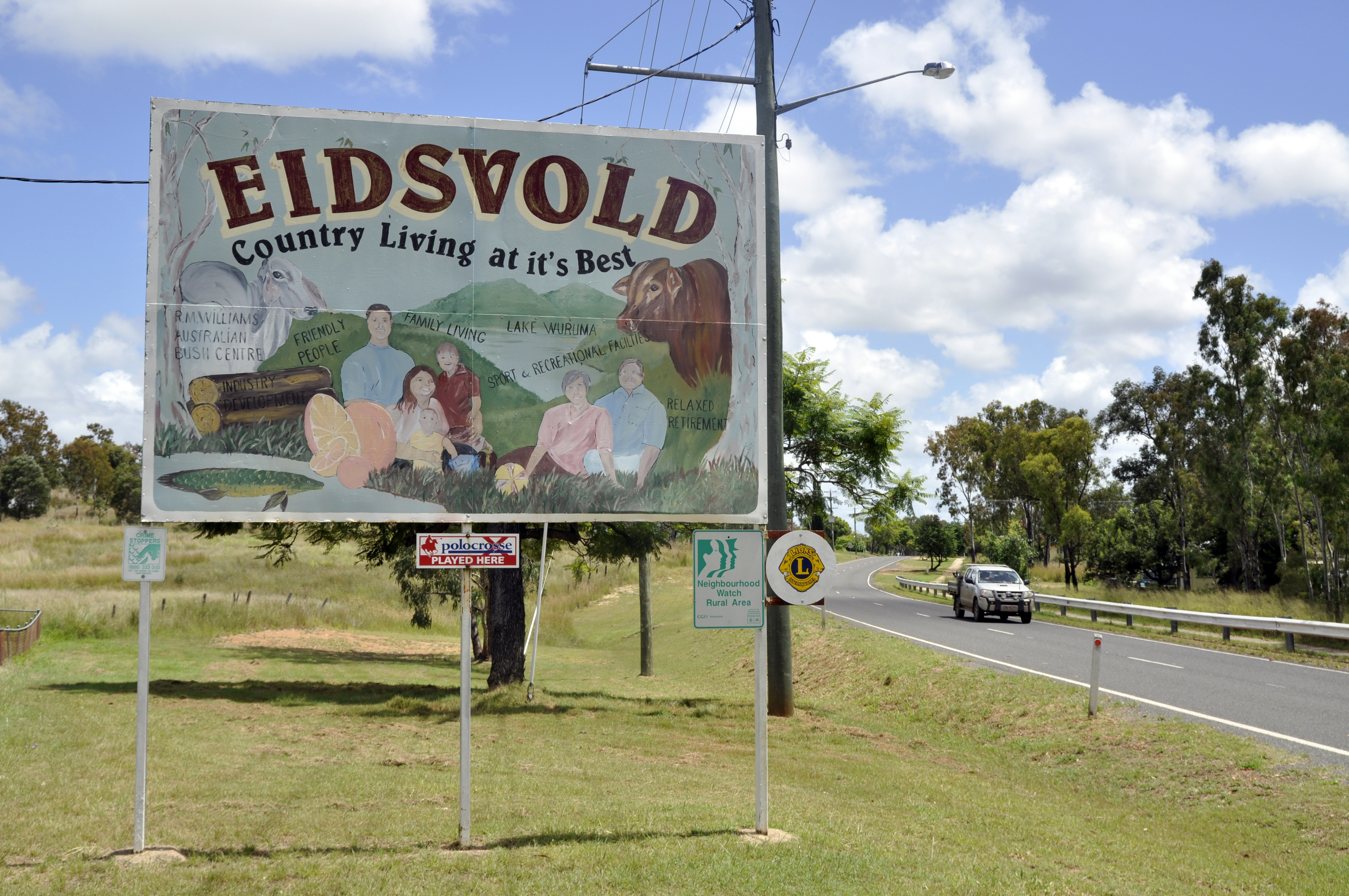
- Eidsvold, 2011

- Interactive map of Eidsvold
- Coordinates: 25.3719°S 151.1230°E
- Country: Australia
- State: Queensland
- LGA: North Burnett Region
- Location: 73.0 km (45.4 mi) NW of Gayndah; 226 km (140 mi) WSW of Bundaberg; 233 km (145 mi) SSW of Gladstone; 411 km (255 mi) NW of Brisbane

Government
  - State electorate: Callide
  - Federal division: Flynn

Area
  - Total: 454.3 km^{2} (175.4 sq mi)

Population
  - Total: 538 (2021 census)
  - Density: 1.1842/km^{2} (3.067/sq mi)
- Time zone: UTC+10:00 (AEST)
- Postcode: 4627
Localities around Eidsvold
Wuruma Dam	Ceratodus	Eidsvold East
Eidsvold West	Eidsvold	Grosvenor
Eidsvold West	Coonambula	Malmoe

Eidsvold (/ˈaɪdzvoʊld/) is a rural town and locality in the North Burnett Region, Queensland, Australia. The town is the self-proclaimed Beef Capital of the Burnett and is a hub for the regional cattle industry. In the 2021 census, the locality of Eidsvold had a population of 538 people.

== Geography ==
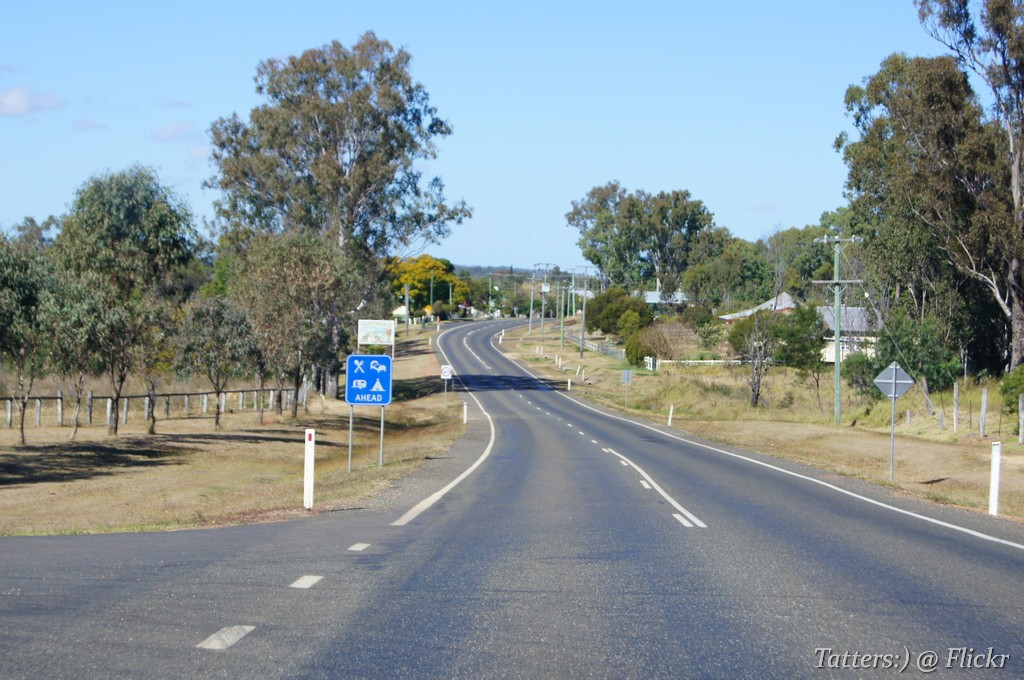
Arriving at Eidsvold from the north on the Burnett Highway, 2011

Eidsvold is situated on the Burnett Highway approximately 430 kilometres (270 mi) north of the state capital, Brisbane. The highway passes through the locality from the south-east to the north-east, passing through the town's main street (Moreton Street). The Mungar Junction to Monto branch railway passes from south-east to north-east through the locality, roughly parallel to the highway; the Eidsvold railway station serves the town. The Eidsvold–Theodore Road (State Route 73) runs south and then west from the town.

== History ==
Wakka Wakka (Waka Waka, Wocca Wocca, Wakawaka) is an Australian Aboriginal language spoken in the Burnett River catchment. The Wakka Wakka language region includes the landscape within the local government boundaries of the North and South Burnett Regional Council, particularly the towns of Eidsvold, Cherbourg, Murgon, Kingaroy, Gayndah and Mundubbera.

The town is named for Eidsvold Station, a nearby property, that is named for Eidsvoll, Norway (using the pre-1918 spelling) where the Norwegian Constitution was signed in 1814. The station was given this name by the Archer brothers, Scottish settlers who also had land holdings in Norway. The Eidsvold run was licensed to Thomas Archer in June 1848.

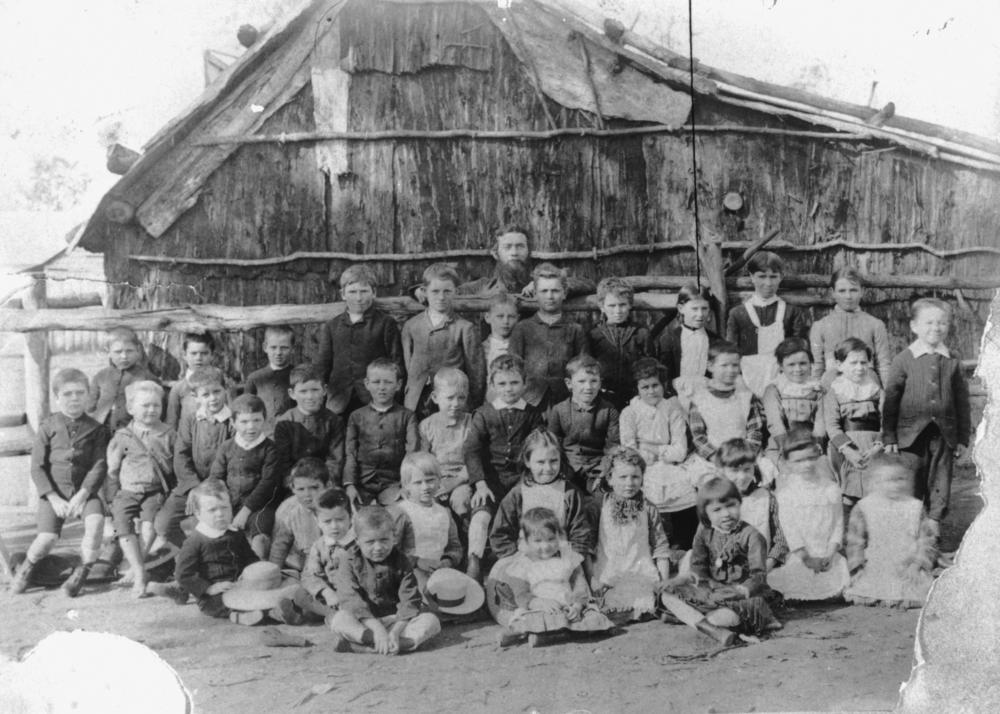
Eidsvold school, 1887

Gold was discovered in the Eidsvold area by July 1887. Miners quickly moved into the area. Eidsvold Goldfield was officially proclaimed on 17 November 1887.

The Town Reserve, 3 miles (4.8 km) east of the station homestead, was surveyed by Mark Shields in 1887. The town reserve was proclaimed on 19 March 1890.

The post office opened 19 September 1887.

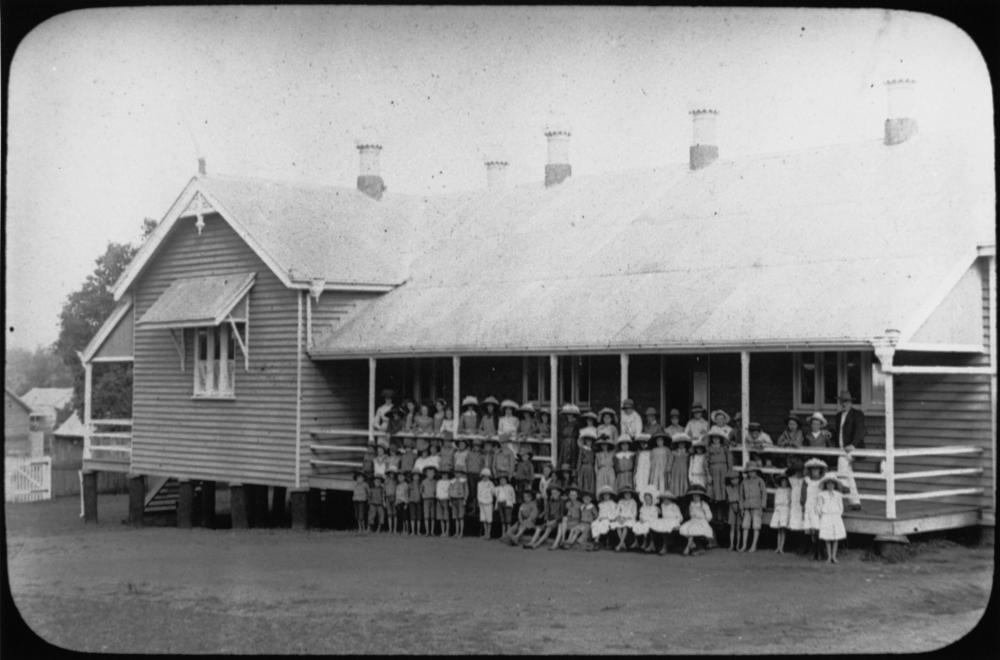
Eidsvold State School, 1912

Eidsvold Provisional School opened on 1 April 1889 in a 9-by-5-metre (30 by 16 ft) building with galvanised iron roof under teacher Arthur McKenzie. As miners and their families moved to Eidsvold, the number of students rose quickly and, in 1892, a new building was constructed as Eidsvold State School. In 1965, the school expanded to offer secondary schooling to Year 10. IN 1986, the school expanded to offer Years 11 and 12.

A police station was established in Hawkwood in 1881. However, in August 1889, it was relocated to Eidsvold.

The Church of the Nazarene established a congregation in Eidsvold in 1950 and built a timber church at 12 Moreton Street in 1953. However, the congregation declined and the church closed. The building was purchased by the local Uniting Church in Australia congregation, who had previously been meeting in the CWA rooms, and opened it as the Eidsvold Uniting Church on 23 February 1980.

== Demographics ==
In the 2006 census, the town of Eidsvold had a population of 459 people.

In the 2011 census, the locality of Eidsvold had a population of 630 people.

In the 2016 census, the locality of Eidsvold had a population of 574 people.

In the 2021 census, the locality of Eidsvold had a population of 538 people.

== Heritage listings ==
Eidsvold has a number of heritage-listed sites, including:

- Eidsvold No.1 Cemetery, Cemetery Road
- Eidsvold Homestead, Eidsvold Road
- Dr Tom Bancroft's Laboratory, 22 Golden Spur Street
- former Eidsvold Court House, Hodgkinson Street
- Eidsvold Goldfield (Mount Rose Mine), off Mount Rose Street
- Eidsvold Racecourse, off Racecourse Road

== Education ==
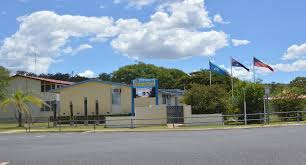
Eidsvold State School, 2024

Eidsvold State School is a government primary and secondary (Kindergarten-Year 12) school for boys and girls at 7 Hodgkinson Street (25.3723°S 151.1212°E). In 2017, the school had an enrolment of 92 students with 11 teachers and 12 non-teaching staff (8 full-time equivalent).

== Amenities ==
Eidsvold has an R. M. Williams Australian bush learning centre, historical museum and complex, swimming pool, showground and bowling and golf clubs.

The North Burnett Regional Council operate a public library at 36 Moreton Street.

The historical museum pays tribute to the 62 soldiers from the Eidsvold area that served in the First World War. Displays include photographs, medals and the Shire of Eidsvold Honour Board.

The Eidsvold branch of the Queensland Country Women's Association meets at the QCWA Hall at 40 Moreton Street.

Eidsvold Uniting Church is at 12 Moreton Street (25.3660°S 151.1207°E).

== Notable residents ==
- David and Thomas Archer, pioneer settlers
- Thomas Lane Bancroft, medical doctor, parasitologist, cotton breeder, naturalist, scientist
- Jim Burrows, Member of the Queensland Legislative Assembly
- Percy Byrnes, Member of the Victorian Legislative Council
- David Farrell, Member of the Queensland Legislative Assembly
- George Farrell, Member of the Queensland Legislative Assembly
- Trai Fuller, rugby league footballer
- George Halford, Anglican bush brother and bishop of Rockhampton
- Lindsay Hartwig, politician
- Nev Hewitt, Member of the Queensland Legislative Assembly
- William Forster McCord, Member of the Queensland Legislative Assembly
- Lloyd McDermott, Australia's first indigenous barrister and Australian rugby union player
- Maureen Watson, Indigenous activist
- R. M. Williams, bushman and entrepreneur
