= Mundubbera =

- Town
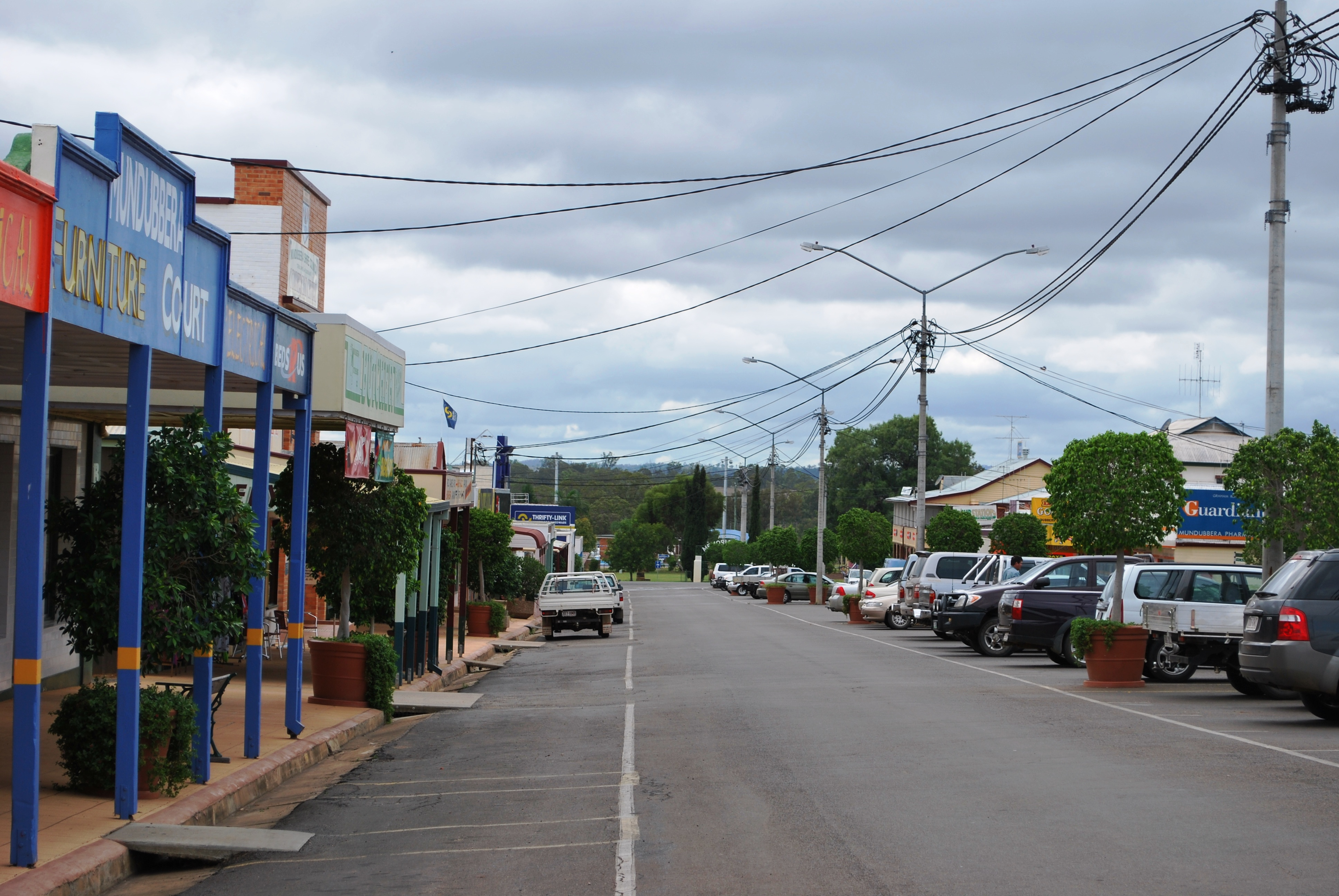
- Lyons St in Mundubbera

- Interactive map of Mundubbera
- Coordinates: 25.5880°S 151.2991°E
- Country: Australia
- State: Queensland
- LGA: North Burnett Region
- Location: 36.5 km (22.7 mi) W of Gayndah; 184 km (114 mi) WSW of Bundaberg; 194 km (121 mi) WNW of Gympie; 209 km (130 mi) N of Dalby; 360 km (220 mi) NW of Brisbane

Government
  - State electorate: Callide
  - Federal division: Flynn

Area
  - Total: 35.7 km^{2} (13.8 sq mi)

Population
  - Total: 1,120 (2021 census)
  - Density: 31.37/km^{2} (81.3/sq mi)
- Time zone: UTC+10:00 (AEST)
- Postcode: 4626
Localities around Mundubbera
O'Bil Bil	Mundowran	Philpott
Riverleigh	Mundubbera	Philpott
Boynewood	Boynewood	Glenrae

Mundubbera (/mʌnˈdʌbərə/ mun-DUB-ər-ə) is a rural town and a locality in the North Burnett Region, Queensland, Australia. In the 2021 census, the locality of Mundubbera had a population of 1,120 people.

Mundubbera is the self-proclaimed "Citrus Capital of Queensland", although this is disputed by the neighbouring (and rival) town of Gayndah.

== Geography ==
The town is in the Wide Bay–Burnett region on the Burnett Highway, 363 kilometres (226 mi) north west of the state capital, Brisbane, 209 kilometres (130 mi) north of Dalby and 200 kilometres (120 mi) west of the regional centre, Bundaberg. The Mundubbera-Durong Road exits to the south.

Mundubbera is built on the bank on the Burnett River.

The Mundubbera district is bounded on the east by the Binjour Plateau and on the south and west by the Burnett River. Devonian, Carboniferous, Triassic, and post-Triassic sediments have all been found in the district. Devonian and Carboniferous sediments are incorporated into the late or post-Permian folds which affect the Yarrol Basin. A large syncline is exposed, commonly called the Mundubbera Syncline. Folded Triassic strata are found in the western part of the district in a fault block. There is evidence of Tertiary or post-Triassic sediments in horizontal sandstone. Near Riverleigh, fossil corals were found in limestone during the 1920s. These were studied by Dorothy Hill of the University of Queensland.

== History ==
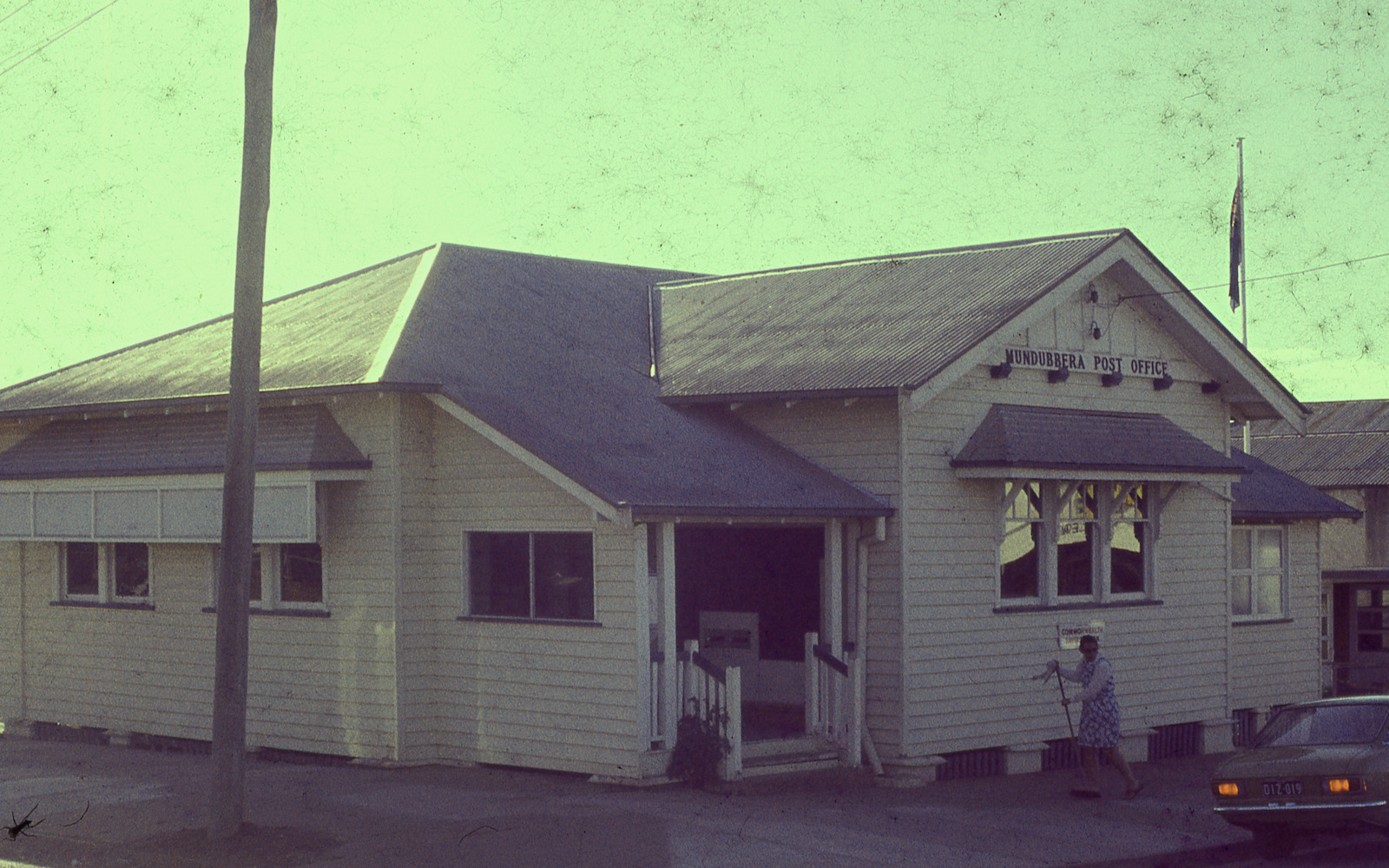
Mundubbera Post Office Mundubbera Queensland 1975

Gureng Gureng (also known as Gooreng Gooreng, Goreng Goreng, Goeng, Gurang, Goorang Goorang, Korenggoreng) is an Australian Aboriginal language spoken by the Gureng Gureng people. The Gooreng Gooreng language region includes the towns of Bundaberg, Gin Gin and Miriam Vale extending south towards Childers, inland to Monto and Mt Perry. Wakka Wakka (Waka Waka, Wocca Wocca, Wakawaka) is an Australian Aboriginal language spoken in the Burnett River catchment. The Wakka Wakka language region includes the landscape within the local government boundaries of the North and South Burnett Regional Council, particularly the towns of Mundubbera, Cherbourg, Murgon, Kingaroy, Gayndah, and Eidsvold.

The name of the town comes from the name of a pastoral property established in 1848 by H.P. Bouverie. It is believed to be an Aboriginal word, possibly from the Kabi language, meaning sharp ridges or climbing steps cut in a tree. It has also been suggested it may mean meeting place of the waters referring to the confluence of the Burnett, Auburn and Boyne rivers just upstream from Mundubbera.

European settlement took place in the late 1840s. A town reserve was established on 26 November 1861. Closer settlement, involving migrants from Germany, Britain and the Netherlands, did not take place until the early 1900s and the town was established in its existing site prior to World War I.

Mundubbera Post Office opened by 1 July 1912 (a receiving office had been open from 1911).

Mundubbera State School opened on 7 November 1913. The school was originally on land bordered by Stuart-Russell, Mahoney and Leichhardt Streets. In 1963, a new site in Bunce Street was developed to offer secondary schooling to Year 10. New classrooms for primary schooling were added in Bunce Street in 1980. In 2022, it was renamed Mundubbera State College.

The Mungar Junction to Monto railway line serviced the town from 1914.

A library was established in Mundubbera in December 1933 in the School of Arts.

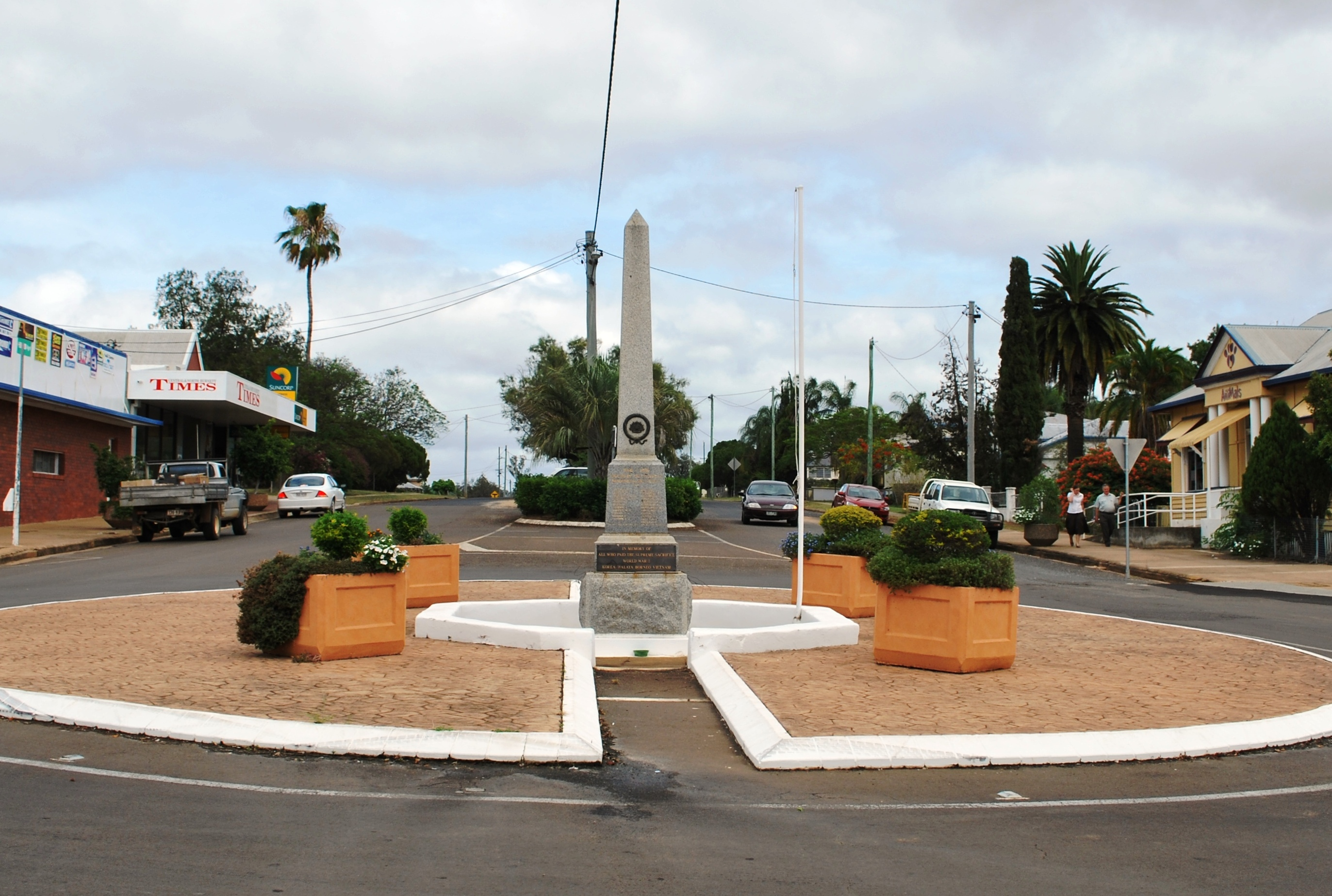
Mundubbera War Memorial, 2008

The Mundubbera War Memorial commemorating those from the district who served in World War I was unveiled by the Member of the Queensland Legislative Assembly for Brisbane and Minister for Works, Mick Kirwan, on 27 May 1928.

Henry Zipf planted the first citrus orchards in 1933 and established Mundubbera as a major producer of export citrus. The recent (2006) drought and the aftereffects of the 2004 Citrus canker outbreak in Emerald has had a dampening effect of the citrus industry in the area.

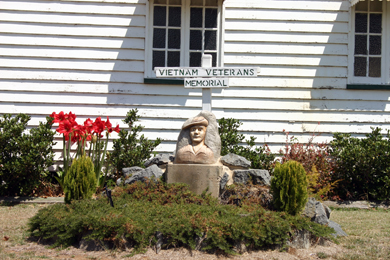
Vietnam Veterans Memorial, Mundubbera, 2010

The Mundubbera Vietnam Veterans Memorial commemorates those who served in the Vietnam War. It is located beside the RSL Memorial Hall.

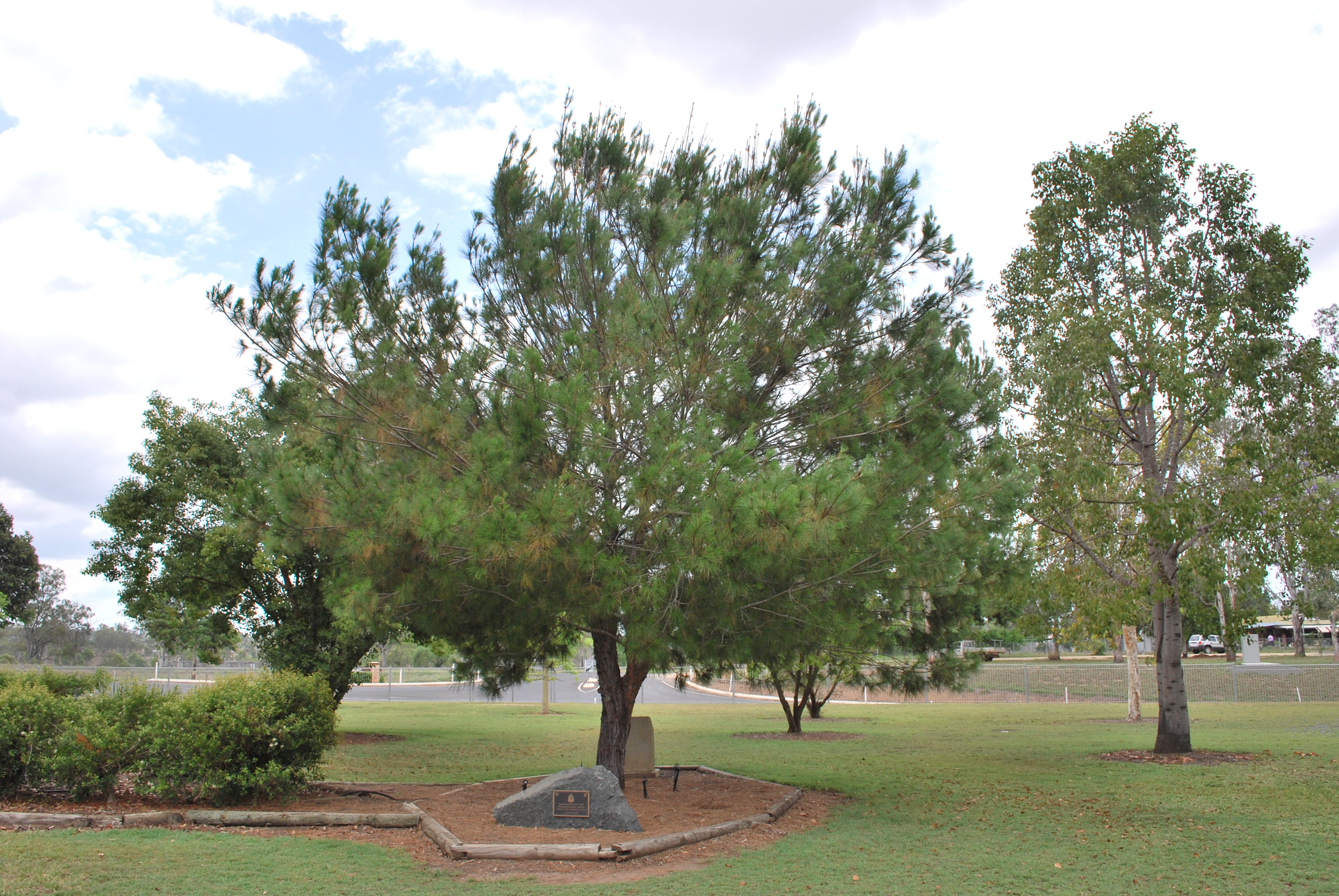
Lone Pine memorial at Mundubbera, 2008

On 11 November 1995, members of the RSL planted a Lone Pine war memorial tree from a seedling whose lineage links back to Gallipoli.

== Demographics ==
In the 2006 census, the town of Mundubbera had a population of 1,053 people.

In the 2016 census, the locality of Mundubbera had a population of 1,261 people.

In the 2021 census, the locality of Mundubbera had a population of 1,120 people.

== Heritage listings ==
Mundubbera has a number of heritage-listed sites, including:

- Mundubbera Butter Factory (also known as Maryborough Co-operative Dairy Association Butter Factory), 26 Bowen Road
- Mundubbera Cemetery, Kinchela Street
- O'Regan Memorial Gates, Leichhardt Street
- former Mundubbera Shire Hall and Bloxsome Memorial Building (also known as Mundubbera Library), Lyons Street
- Mundubbera War Memorial, intersection of Lyons and Bouverie Streets
- Jones Weir, Seligmann Avenue

== Economy ==
The economy Mundubbera is predominantly agriculture and forestry. The major agricultural activities in Mundubbera are cattle grazing and, in the irrigated areas, fruit growing. Fruit grown in the Mundubbera area includes citrus, mangoes, avocadoes and stone fruit. In addition, Mundubbera is Queensland's largest producer of table grapes.

During the fruit picking seasons Mundubbera can double in size as many itinerant workers and backpackers from around the world come to the town looking for work on the orchards. Seasonal workers are accommodated in two large caravan parks in Mundubbera itself or in many on-site parks. Since 2010, workers from Tonga and Papua New Guinea have been supported through the Pacific Seasonal Worker Pilot Scheme. The success of this endeavour has meant that the Seasonal Worker Program will be fully operational from 1 July 2012.

Supporting the fruit industry are businesses such as a fruit juice processor and several packing sheds. Bugs for Bugs, an integrated pest management business, raises insects in the old butter factory. These insects that act as a biological control for common fruit pests, reducing chemical insecticide use.

With large areas of State forest in the shire, Mundubbera also has a large timber industry with a mill in Mundubbera town. Other industries include piggeries and dairying. Commercial activity is limited and consists mainly of small businesses supporting local residents and farmers. The town has two hotels, two motels and an IGA supermarket, plus the usual small-town services such as a butcher, baker, newsagency, post office and a public library open to the general public.

== Transport ==
The town is about 1 kilometre (0.62 mi) south of the intersection of the Burnett Highway and the Mundubbera–Durong Road. The Burnett Highway links Mundubbera with Gayndah and Goomeri to the east; and Eidsvold, Monto and Biloela to the north. The Mundubbera-Durong links Mundubbera to Dalby and Toowoomba in the Darling Downs. This road is single lane bitumen in places. Public transport is limited. In 2005 the only public transport servicing Mundubbera was a bus service operating once a week on Thursdays to Bundaberg and on Wednesdays and Fridays to Maryborough. By 2022, the bus service to Bundaberg was thrice weekly and to Maryborough was once weekly.

In 2012 the Queensland Government under the Premiership of Campbell Newman announced that the railway line would no longer be looked after.

== Education ==
Mundubbera State College is a government primary and secondary (Early Childhood to Year 10) school for boys and girls at 57 Bunce Street (25.5854°S 151.2935°E). In 2017, the school had an enrolment of 242 students with 24 teachers (22 full-time equivalent) and 24 non-teaching staff (14 full-time equivalent). It includes a special education program. The school previously had a preschool but following the introduction of Prep, the preschool has been converted into a music room.

The nearest government school offering secondary education to Year 12 is Burnett State College (formerly Gayndah State High School), 45 kilometres (28 mi) to the east in Gayndah. Distance education and boarding schools are other options.

Other primary schools in the area include the small school cluster of the rural schools of Boynewood State School (opened 1915), Binjour Plateau State School (1913), Monogorilby State School (1936) and Riverleigh State School (1914); Riversleigh State School was closed at the end of 2009 due to lack of enrolment.

== Amenities ==
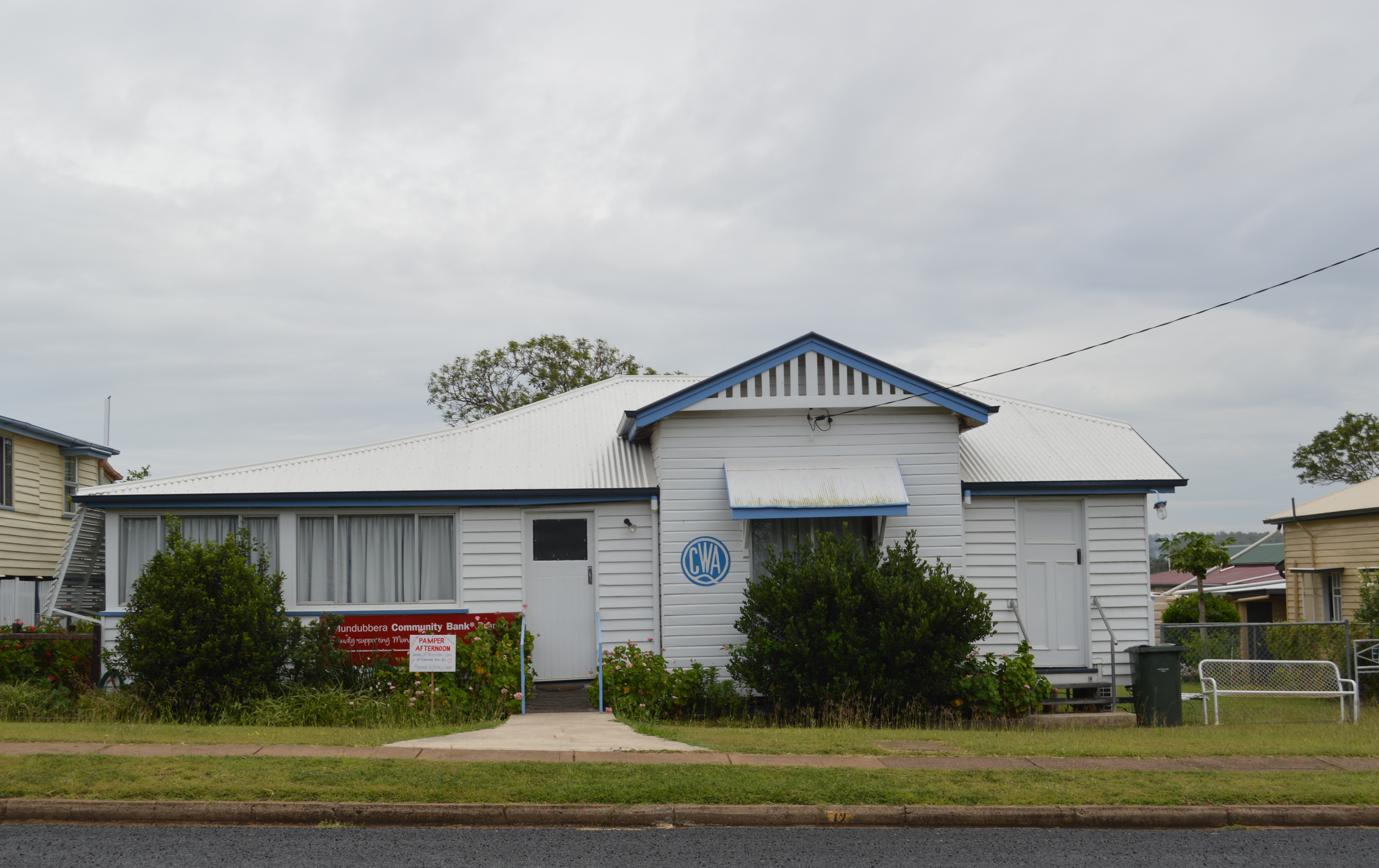
Mundubbera QCWA rooms, 2017

The North Burnett Regional Council operates a public library at 30 Lyons Street and a public swimming pool at Bauer Street in Mundubbera.

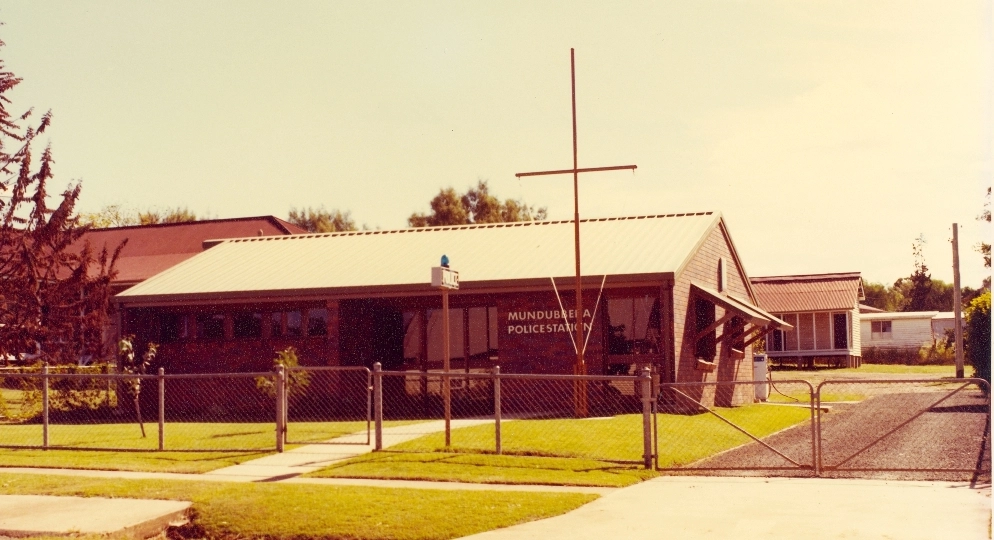
Mundubbera police station, circa 1985

The Mundubbera branch of the Queensland Country Women's Association meets at 79 Lyons Street.

Jehovah Tsidkenu Wesleyan Methodist Church is at 1 Diana Street (25.5813°S 151.2973°E). It is part of the Wesleyan Methodist Church of Australia.

The Apex Ski area, 4 kilometres (2.5 mi) from Jones Weir along Coonambula Road, is a popular recreation facility. Boating, fishing and water skiing all take place on the weir. Facilities include boat ramp, jetty, barbecue area and public toilets. Camping is not allowed. It is a scenic site for bird watching and fishing. Jones Weir is stocked by the Mundubbera Anglers Fish Stocking Association Inc. Platypus and Ceratodus (Lungfish) may be spotted. Jones Weir is owned and managed by Sunwater. North Burnett Regional Council own and manage the boat ramp, facilities and recreation areas located approx. 2 kilometres (1.2 mi) upstream. Public access is permitted in designated areas only.

== Attractions ==
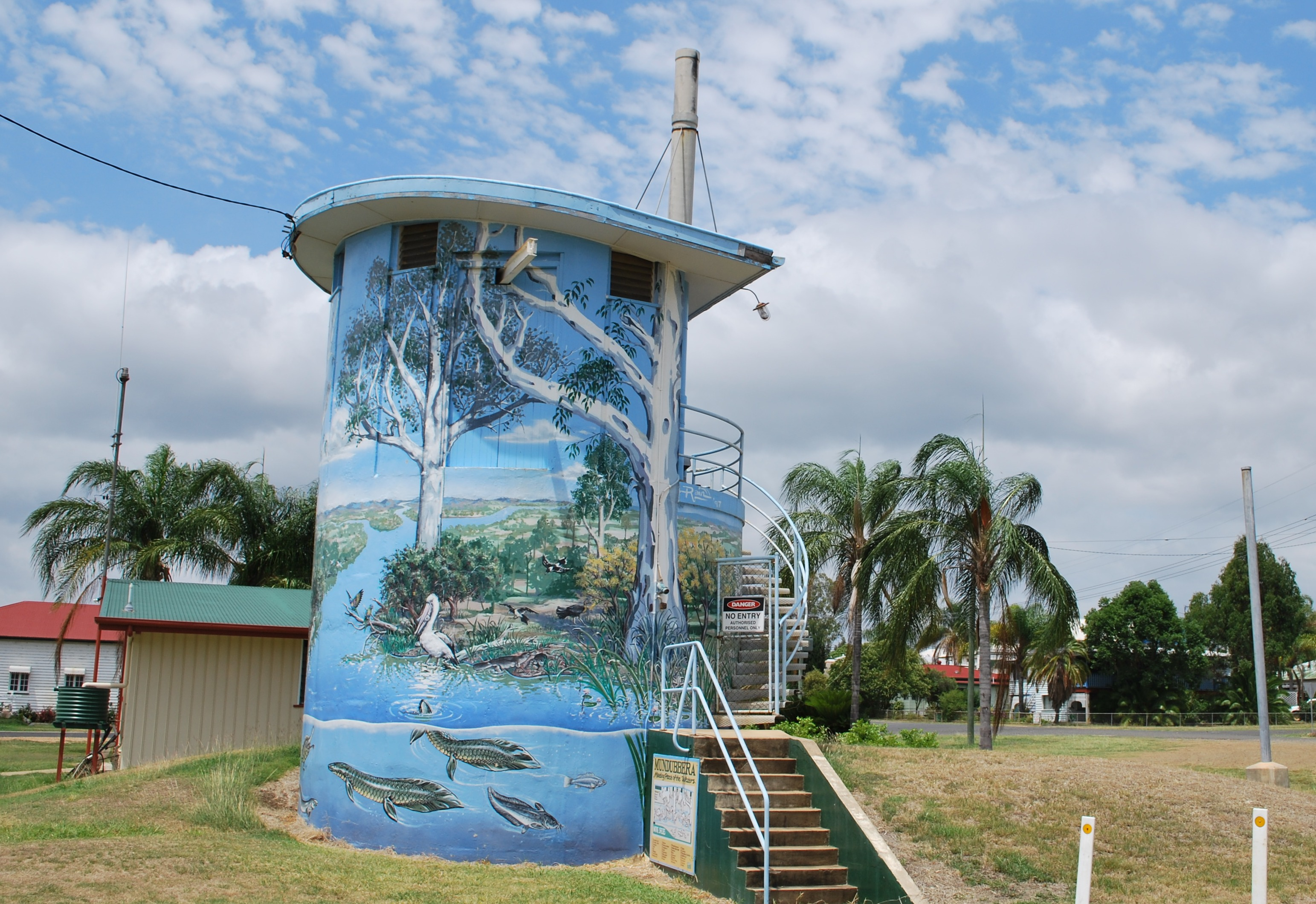
The 360-degree mural showing the joining of the three rivers at Mundubbera.

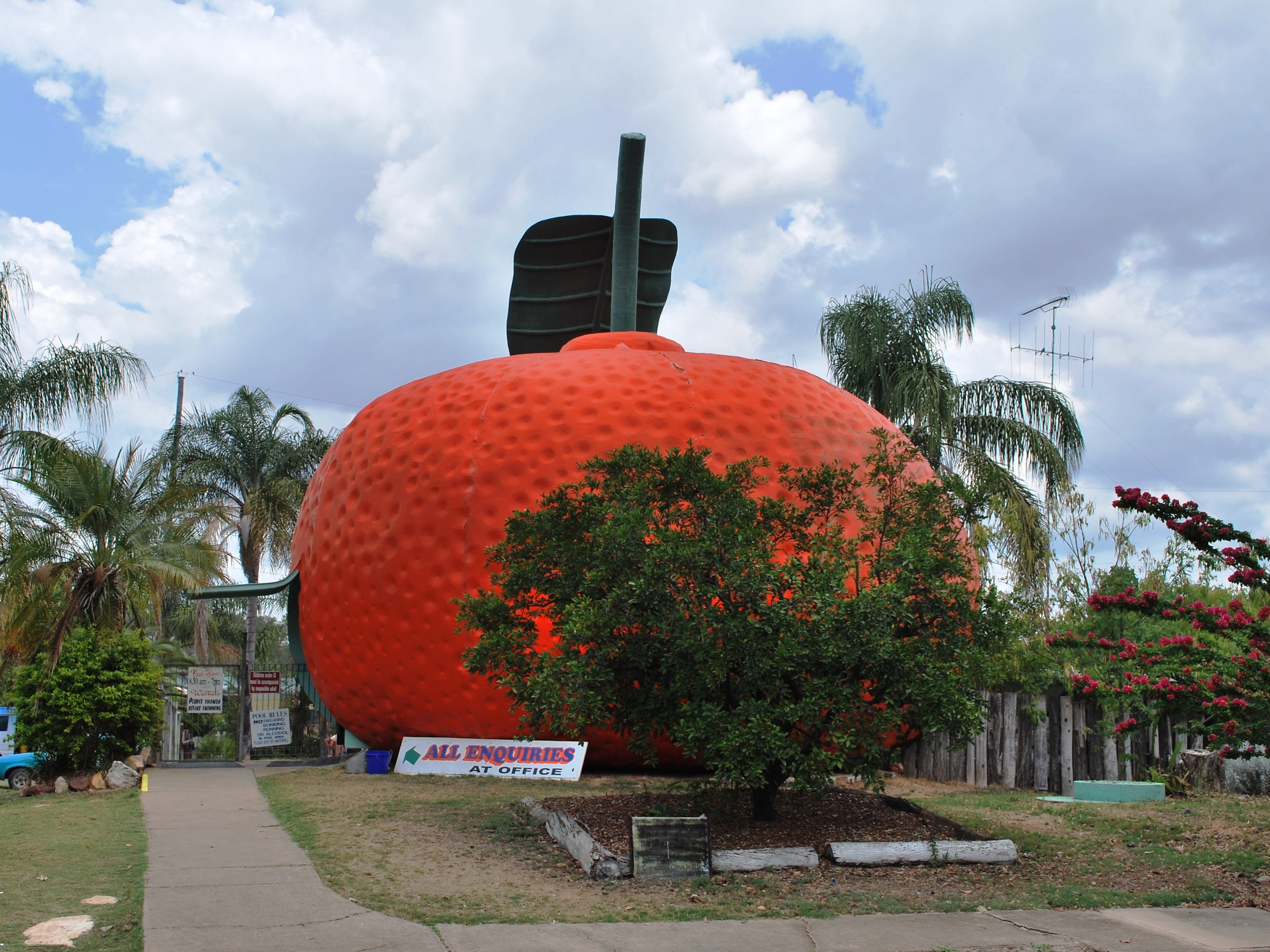
The Big Mandarin

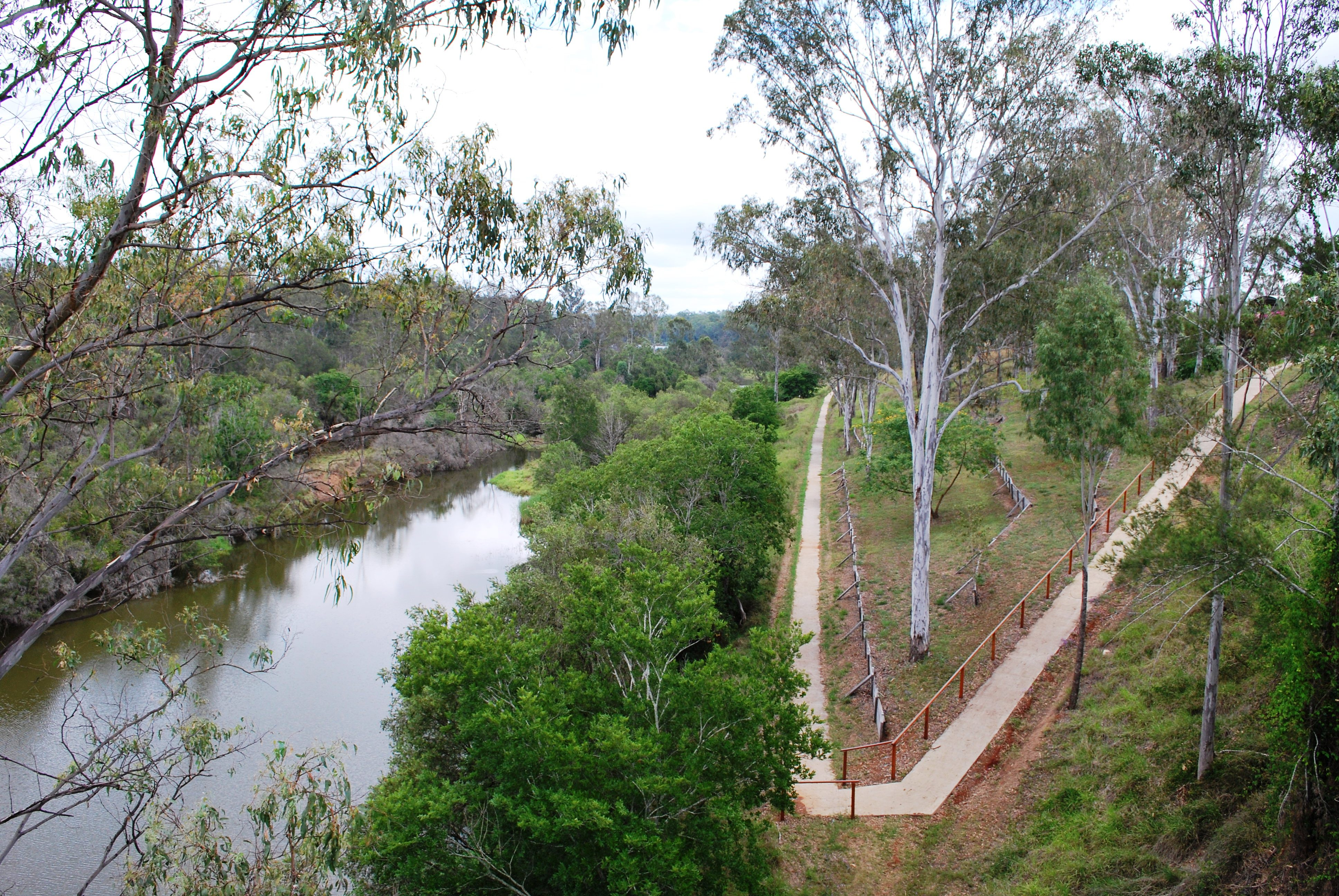
Mundubbera Riverside Walk beside the Burnett River

While Mundubbera attracts seasonal workers from around the world, tourism remains relatively undeveloped.

Some attractions include:

- The nearby Auburn River National Park is a good location to find Queensland Lungfish (Neoceratodus forsteri), known locally as Ceratodus, a rare living fossil found only in the Burnett and Mary Rivers. This park is popular with bush walkers and rock climbers. It features cascades, great swimming spots, caves, balancing rocks and superb scenery.
- The town lookout on the entrance to town on the Burnett Highway is home to a Black stump, to symbolise Mundubbera's location on the edge of the Outback.
- The Big Mandarin, a larger-than-life fibreglass model of an Ellendale Mandarin doubles as a kiosk for a local caravan park. It is one of many "Big" tourist attractions that dot the Australian landscape.
- The Meeting Place of the Waters 360-degree mural painted on the sewerage pumping station is a visual tribute to the Boyne Auburn and Burnett Rivers that provide Mundubbera with its prosperity.
- The Riverside Walk, Bicentennial Park and Railway Precinct are beside the Heritage listed Jones Weir.
- The Burnett River Bridges section of the Boyne Burnett Inland Rail Trail was opened in 2022 at Mt Debateable Railway Siding, Gayndah. Sixteen kilometres of it lies beside the Burnett River. The Red Gulley Bridge, Slab Creek Bridge, Spring Creek Bridge, Boomerang Bridge, Humphery Bridges Numbers 1, 2 ("Faith" Bridge or "bridge of faith"), and 3 and Roth's Bridge are passed on the way to the other end at Mundubbera Railway Precinct. The Official Register of Engineering Heritage Markers listed the Degilbo-Mundubbera Railway Bridges in 2016. A total of 12 bridges, including some on this section of Rail Trail, are recognised with one Engineering Heritage Marker representing the “best example of a collection of historic railway bridges in Australia”.

== Events ==
Mundubbera hosts a popular seven-a-side cricket tournament in February each year.

The Mundubbera Fish stocking association hosts a popular fishing competition.

The Ellendale Open, a pro-am golf tournament is held each year, on the Queens Birthday weekend, at the Mundubbera Golf Club.

The towns annual agricultural show occurs on the second Friday and Saturday of May each year, at the towns Show Grounds, amongst other events, it features a rodeo, cattle judging, chicken judging, and art and food judging, campdraft events, as well as a side show alley.

Until recently the Rugby league teams of Mundubbera and Gayndah would play-off in the State of Oranges, a pun on the State of Origin series between New South Wales and Queensland that recognised the strong but friendly rivalry between the two towns. This match has been reinstated and will be played on the Queen's Birthday Weekend in June.

The Mundubbera Bullarama committee runs an annual Rodeo in September, which attracts bull riders from around Queensland. Usually held at the towns show grounds, but in 2007 the event was held at the Scampers Grounds, an area also containing the towns Motocross Track, and 6 cricket ovals that hold a large portion of the seven-a-side cricket tournament.

Mundubbera has a motocross track regarded by some as the best natural terrain track in Queensland, it holds several meets each year, in series such as the Thundercross Series.

Mundubbera celebrated their centenary on the weekend of the 24 and 25 March.

== Notable people ==
Some notable people from Mundubbera include:

- Kurt Brown, Queensland and Australian Lawn Bowls Champion, was raised in Mundubbera. Brown has 12 Queensland titles and 2 Australian Titles. He has represented Queensland on 126 occasions and also trialled for the Commonwealth Games Lawn Bowls Team.
- Wayne Goss, former Queensland Premier, was born in Mundubbera
- Martin Love, Australian test cricketer, was born and raised in Mundubbera
- Kim McCosker, author and cook, was raised in Mundubbera
- Stuart Tinney, Olympic level equestrian rider and gold medalist, was born in Mundubbera
