= Humphery, Queensland =

Humphery
- Suburb
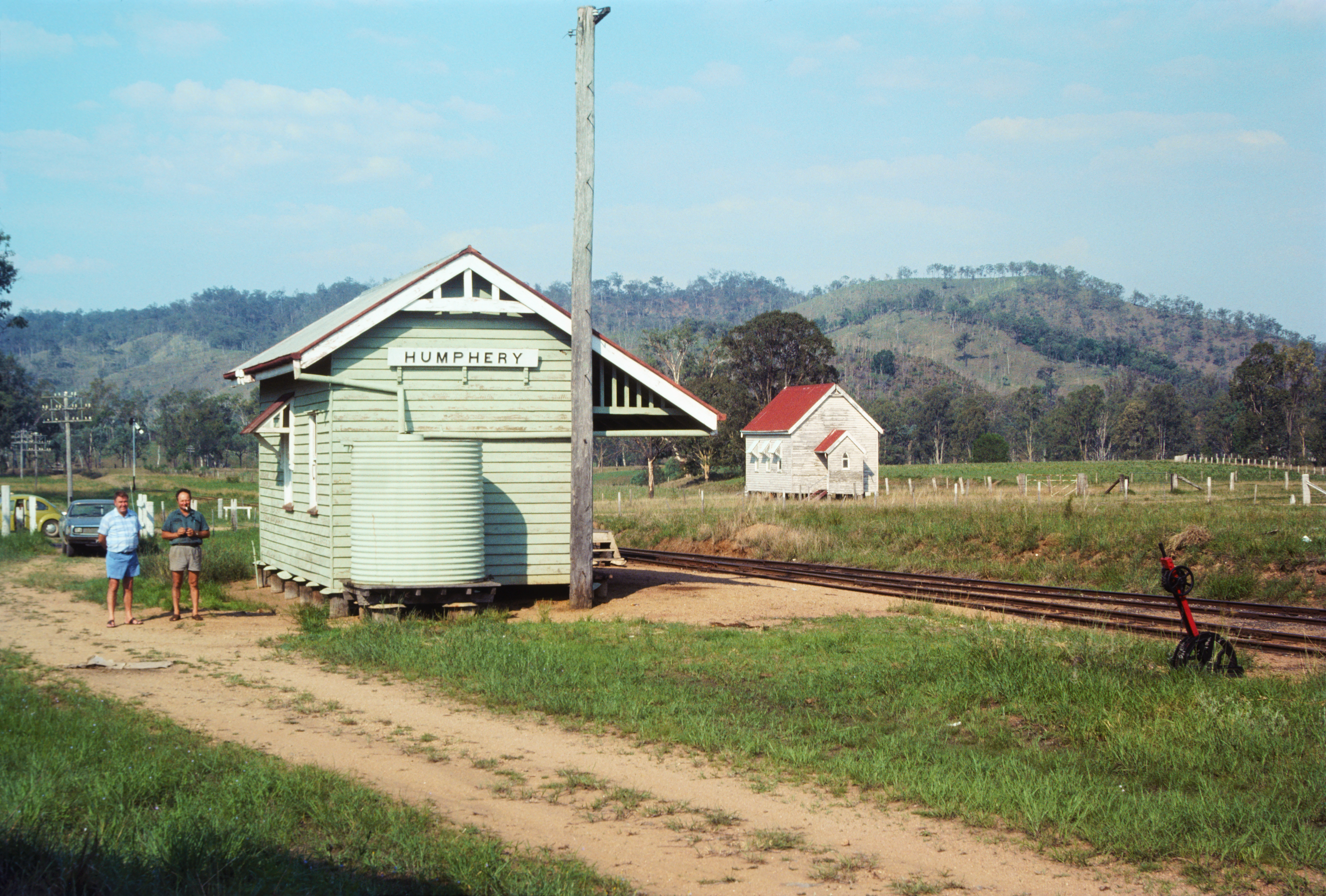
- Humphrey railway station, 1977

- Interactive map of Humphery
- Coordinates: 25.6066°S 151.4733°E
- Country: Australia
- State: Queensland
- LGA: North Burnett Region
- Location: 15.7 km (9.8 mi) WNW of Gayndah; 165 km (103 mi) W of Maryborough; 340 km (210 mi) NNW of Brisbane

Government
  - State electorate: Callide
  - Federal division: Flynn

Area
  - Total: 34.0 km^{2} (13.1 sq mi)

Population
  - Total: 24 (2021 census)
  - Density: 0.706/km^{2} (1.83/sq mi)
- Time zone: UTC+10:00 (AEST)
- Postcode: 4625
Suburbs around Humphery
| Philpott | Binjour | Reids Creek |
| Glenrae | Humphery | Dirnbir |
| Glenrae | Deep Creek | Deep Creek |

Humphery is a rural locality in the North Burnett Region, Queensland, Australia. In the 2021 census, Humphery had a population of 24 people.

== Geography ==
The Burnett River forms the south-western boundary and part of the southern boundary before flowing through and forming part of the eastern boundary. Aranbanga Creek also forms part of the southern boundary before joining the Burnett River.

Boomerang is a neighbourhood in the locality (25.6166°S 151.4333°E).

The Mungar-to-Monto railway line traversed the locality roughly following the northern side of the Burnett River, entering from the east (Dirnbir) and exiting to the north-west (Philpott). There were two railway stations serving the locality:

- Humphery railway station (25.6022°S 151.4776°E)
- Boomerang railway station (25.6197°S 151.4311°E)

== History ==
Boomerang takes its name from a pastoral run of 16,000 acres (6,500 ha) which was 10 miles (16 km) from the town of Gayndah. In 1853 the run was held in 1853 by Edmund L. Smee.

The seventh section of the Mungar Junction to Monto railway line opened from Gayndah to Boomerang was opened on 1 November 1913 with the Humphery and Boomerang railway stations serving the locality.

On 1 June 1918, one man was killed and two women were seriously injured following this collision between a cattle train and a mixed goods train at Humphery railway station. The collision crushed the guard's van and telescoped a passenger carriage, fatally injuring one of its occupants.

The railway line closed in 2012. In 2022, the railway line through Humphery was re-opened as a section of the Boyne Burnett Inland Rail Trail.

== Demographics ==
In the 2016 census, Humphery had a population of 34 people.

In the 2021 census, Humphery had a population of 24 people.

== Heritage listings ==
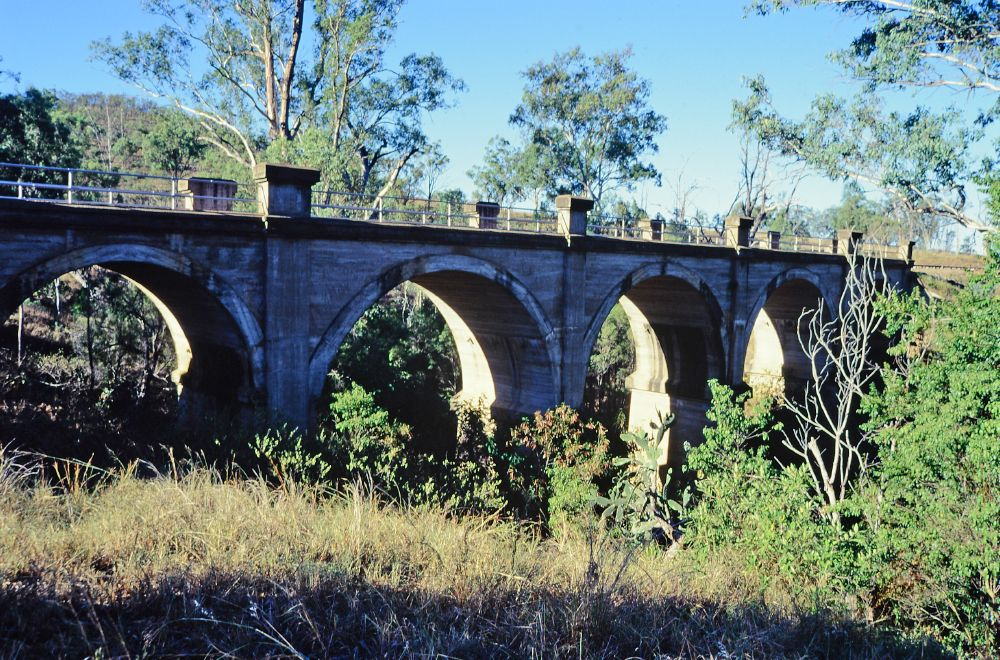
Humphery rail bridge, 2002

Humphery has a number of heritage-listed sites, including:

- Humphery Railway Bridge, Mungar-to-Monto railway line (25.6151°S 151.4536°E)

== Education ==
There are no schools in Humphery. The nearest government primary schools are Gayndah State School in Gayndah to the east, Binjour Plateau State School in neighbouring Binjour to the north, and Mundubbera State College in Mundubbera to the west. The nearest government secondary schools are Mundubbera State College (to Year 10) and Burnett State College (to Year 12) in Gayndah.
