= Humphery Railway Bridge =

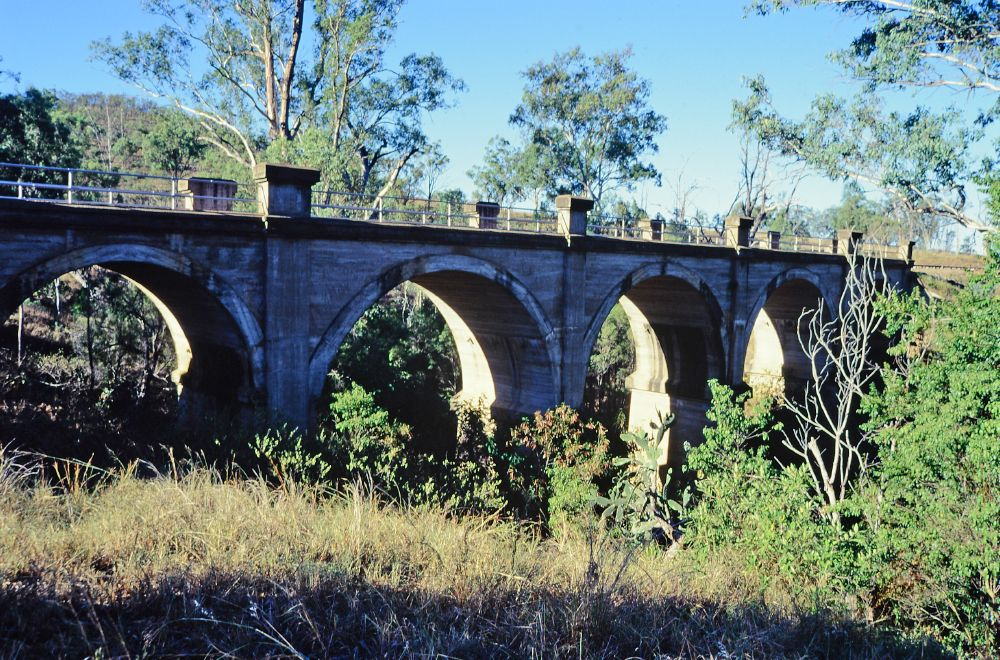
- Humphery Railway Bridge, 2002

- Location within Queensland Location within Australia
- 25.6151°S 151.4536°E
- Location: Mungar to Monto line, Humphery, North Burnett Region, Queensland, Australia

History
- Design period: 1900–1914 (early 20th century)
- Built: 1913

Site notes
- Architect: William Pagan

Queensland Heritage Register
- Official name: Rail Bridge (Humphery)
- Type: state heritage (built)
- Designated: 21 October 1992
- Reference no.: 600518
- Significant period: 1910s (fabric)
- Significant components: pier/s (bridge)

Humphery Railway Bridge is a heritage-listed railway bridge on the Mungar to Monto railway line at Humphery, North Burnett Region, Queensland, Australia. It was designed by William Pagan and built in 1913. It was added to the Queensland Heritage Register on 21 October 1992.

== History ==
The concrete arch bridge supporting the railway line 2.8 kilometres (1.7 mi) west of Humphery was constructed in 1913 as the last of several bridges on this line.

A rail link was requested from Maryborough to the long established town of Gayndah in the 1860s, but construction did not begin until the late 1880s. The line opened to Brooweena in July 1889, Boompa in March 1891 and Biggenden in April 1891. Although the rails ended at Degilbo, this section was not opened until 1893 when flood damage to the bridge over the Mary River at Antigua cut off the lime supply for the sugar industry at Maryborough and Bundaberg and a new supply was opened up near Degilbo. The line ended at Degilbo until the extension to Gayndah began with a 32 kilometres (20 mi) extension to Wetheron that opened in December 1905. Gayndah was finally reached in December 1907. In 1910 a further extension was proposed. Construction of the railway between Gayndah and Mundubbera began in April 1911, anticipating by a few months the official turning of the first sod by Walter Paget, Minister for Railways, on 7 July 1911. The line was opened for traffic between Gayndah and Boomerang in November 1913 and to Mundubbera in February 1914. The line was further extended in the 1920s and reached Monto in September 1928.

The use of concrete arches for railway bridges is a distinctive feature in Queensland and South Australia. The first concrete bridge in Queensland was constructed at Petrie Terrace in 1897. Between 1900 and 1913, six arch concrete railway bridges were constructed in Queensland approximating the term in office of William Pagan as Chief Engineer of Railways and it is believed that he was responsible for their design. The first two (Swansons Rail Bridge near Toowoomba and Deep Creek Railway Bridge near Degilbo), followed the form of a stone arch bridge. However, Steep Rocky Creek Railway Bridge in 1906 departs completely from stone forms and has wall type arches supporting vertical diaphragms with a deck slab carrying the track and ballast; this bridge was built to cross a ravine in rugged country and represents a similar design and technical developments to meet similar requirements to that at Humphery, which was completed a few years later.

== Description ==
The bridge is a concrete arch bridge carrying the Mungar to Monto railway over a dry gully some 2.8 kilometres (1.7 mi) south west of Humphrey Station and 14 kilometres (8.7 mi) west of Gayndah. It has five semicircular arch spans, with solid concrete spandrel walls. Although a simple bridge, it is well detailed with projecting cornices at the bases of the arches, attached pillars above the piers extending above the deck and recessed spandrel walls.

The bridge carries a single 3 ft 6 in gauge railway on a ballasted deck. Its spans are 7.9 metres (26 ft), three at 10.7 metres (35 ft), and 7.9 metres (26 ft) totalling 42.9 metres (141 ft). The solid arch ribs are semicircular, with projecting cornices separating them visually from the piers below. The smaller end spans spring from a higher level, again marked at the pier by a small cornice. The recessed spandrel walls are finished off with the form of concrete slightly patterned to contrast with the smooth finish of the projecting faces of the arches. The railings are of tubular metal between concrete pillars at the piers.

== Tourism ==
The 37.58-kilometre (23.35 mi) Burnett River Bridges section of the Boyne Burnett Inland Rail Trail was opened on 10 September 2022 at Mt Debateable Railway Siding, Mt Debateable Road, Gayndah. Sixteen kilometers of it lies beside the Burnett River. Heading west from the Trail Head the Red Gulley Bridge, Slab Creek Bridge, Spring Creek Bridge, Boomerang Bridge, Humphery Bridges Numbers 1, 2 ("Faith" Bridge or "bridge of faith"), and 3 and Roth's Bridge are passed on the way to the other end at Mundubbera Railway Precinct. The Official Register of Engineering Heritage Markers listed Degilbo-Mundubbera Railway Bridges in October 2016. A total of 12 bridges, including some on this section of Rail Trail, are recognized with one Engineering Heritage Marker representing the “best example of a collection of historic railway bridges in Australia”.

== Heritage listing ==
Humphery Railway Bridge was listed on the Queensland Heritage Register on 21 October 1992 having satisfied the following criteria.

The place is important in demonstrating the evolution or pattern of Queensland's history.

This bridge, which allowed the railway to cross a deep gully, is on a branch line linking early inland towns with Maryborough and demonstrates the way in which Queensland was developed by linking important inland resources with ports. It demonstrates the skill with which the technology of the era was used to solve the problems of climatic conditions and terrain encountered by railway engineers in this process.

The place is important in demonstrating a high degree of creative or technical achievement at a particular period.

This bridge was built to an innovative design with reinforced concrete discontinuous wall-type pinned arches, the second of its type in Australia and only the seventh concrete bridge in Queensland. It was the last of a series of concrete arch bridges built for the Queensland railways between 1900 and 1913 and the third on this line.

The place has a special association with the life or work of a particular person, group or organisation of importance in Queensland's history.

The bridge is an important example of the work of William Pagan, Chief Engineer for Railways and an important figure in the early history of engineering in Queensland.

Engineers Australia listed a total of 12 bridges, including Humphery Railway Bridge, on their Official Register of Engineering Heritage Markers in October 2016. The Degilbo-Mundubbera Railway Bridges are recognized with one Engineering Heritage Marker representing the “best example of a collection of historic railway bridges in Australia”.
