= Aranbanga, Queensland =

Aranbanga
- Suburb
- Interactive map of Aranbanga
- Coordinates: 25.8191°S 151.6511°E
- Country: Australia
- State: Queensland
- LGA: North Burnett Region
- Location: 29.7 km (18.5 mi) S of Gayndah; 176 km (109 mi) NW of Gympie; 336 km (209 mi) NNW of Brisbane

Government
  - State electorate: Callide
  - Federal division: Flynn

Area
  - Total: 221.7 km^{2} (85.6 sq mi)

Population
  - Total: 15 (2021 census)
  - Density: 0.0677/km^{2} (0.175/sq mi)
- Time zone: UTC+10:00 (AEST)
- Postcode: 4625
Suburbs around Aranbanga
Harriet	Barlyne	Penwhaupell
Pile Gully	Aranbanga	Booubyjan
Wigton	Wigton	Wahoon

Aranbanga is a rural locality in the North Burnett Region, Queensland, Australia. In the 2021 census, Aranbanga had a population of 15 people.

== Geography ==
Aranbanga Creek rises in the centre of the locality and flows west towards Pile Gully. The mountain The Three Sisters at 418 metres (1,371 ft) is in the south-west of the locality. The Johngboon State Forest is located in the south-east of the locality.

The principal land use is grazing, but there is a small area of irrigated crops from a small dam in the centre of the locality.

== History ==
The locality and creek both takes their names from an early pastoral run in the district. In 1852 the Aranbanga run was transferred from George Mocatta to W.T. and G.M. Elliott. The run appears by that name on an 1872 and 1878 maps.

== Demographics ==
In the 2016 census, Aranbanga had a population of 10 people.

In the 2021 census, Aranbanga had a population of 15 people.

== Education ==
There are no schools in Aranbanga. The nearest government primary school is Gayndah State School in Gayndah. The nearest government secondary schools is Burnett State College, also in Gaynah.
