= Pile Gully, Queensland =

Pile Gully
- Suburb
- Interactive map of Pile Gully
- Coordinates: 25.7594°S 151.4886°E
- Country: Australia
- State: Queensland
- LGA: North Burnett Region
- Location: 12.9 km (8.0 mi) SW of Gayndah; 170 km (110 mi) NW of Gympie; 340 km (210 mi) NNW of Brisbane

Government
  - State electorate: Callide
  - Federal division: Flynn

Area
  - Total: 167.0 km^{2} (64.5 sq mi)

Population
  - Total: 0 (2021 census)
  - Density: 0.0000/km^{2} (0.000/sq mi)
- Time zone: UTC+10:00 (AEST)
- Postcode: 4625
Suburbs around Pile Gully
Glenrae	Deep Creek	Woodmillar
Old Cooranga	Pile Gully	Harriet
Old Cooranga	Wigton	Aranbanga

Pile Gully is a rural locality in the North Burnett Region, Queensland, Australia. In the 2021 census, Pile Gully had "no people or a very low population".

== Geography ==
The eastern part of the locality is lower land and used for grazing, while the western part is more mountainous and undeveloped. The very northern part of the locality is within the Malmaison State Forest while the south-western and southern parts of the locality are within the Pile Gully State Forest which extends into neighbouring Old Cooranga.

== Demographics ==
In the 2016 census, Pile Gully had a population of 3 people.

In the 2021 census, Pile Gully had "no people or a very low population".

== Education ==
There are no schools in Pile Gully. The nearest government primary school is Gayndah State School in Gayndah to the north-east. The nearest government secondary school is Burnett State College, also in Gayndah.
