= Barlyne, Queensland =

Barlyne
- Suburb
- Interactive map of Barlyne
- Coordinates: 25.7372°S 151.6399°E
- Country: Australia
- State: Queensland
- LGA: North Burnett Region
- Location: 12.2 km (7.6 mi) S of Gayndah; 157 km (98 mi) SW of Bundaberg; 158 km (98 mi) W of Maryborough; 346 km (215 mi) NW of Brisbane

Government
  - State electorate: Callide
  - Federal division: Flynn

Area
  - Total: 35.7 km^{2} (13.8 sq mi)

Population
  - Total: 0 (2021 census)
  - Density: 0.000/km^{2} (0.00/sq mi)
- Time zone: UTC+10:00 (AEST)
- Postcode: 4625
Suburbs around Barlyne
Woodmillar	The Limits	The Limits
Harriet	Barlyne	Penwhaupell
Harriet	Aranbanga	Aranbanga

Barlyne is a rural locality in the North Burnett Region, Queensland, Australia. In the 2021 census, Barlyne had "no people or a very low population".

== Geography ==
The land use is grazing on native vegetation.

== History ==
In the early 1890s, the Inman family selected land 7 miles (11 km) from Gayndah which they called Barlyne. In 1917, the main industry was dairying but there were successful experiments with growing bananas, pawpaws and pineapples.

== Demographics ==
In the 2016 census, Barlyne had "no people or a very low population".

In the 2021 census, Barlyne had "no people or a very low population".

== Education ==
There are no schools in Barlyne. The nearest government primary schools are Gayndah State School in Gayndah to the north and Coalstoun Lakes State School in Coalstoun Lakes to the north-east. The nearest government secondary school is Burnett State College in Gayndah.
