= Dirnbir, Queensland =

Dirnbir
- Suburb
- Interactive map of Dirnbir
- Coordinates: 25.5983°S 151.5427°E
- Country: Australia
- State: Queensland
- LGA: North Burnett Region
- Location: 12.0 km (7.5 mi) WNW of Gayndah; 159 km (99 mi) SW of Bundaberg; 169 km (105 mi) NW of Gympie; 372 km (231 mi) NNW of Brisbane

Government
  - State electorate: Callide
  - Federal division: Flynn

Area
  - Total: 34.0 km^{2} (13.1 sq mi)

Population
  - Total: 59 (2021 census)
  - Density: 1.735/km^{2} (4.49/sq mi)
- Time zone: UTC+10:00 (AEST)
- Postcode: 4625
Suburbs around Dirnbir
Humphery	Reids Creek	Ideraway
Humphery	Dirnbir	Gayndah
Deep Creek	Mount Debateable	Gayndah

Dirnbir is a rural locality in the North Burnett Region, Queensland, Australia. In the 2021 census, Dirnbir had a population of 59 people.

== Geography ==
The Burnett River forms the southern boundary of the locality at an elevation of 100 metres (330 ft) while Reid Creek (a tributary of the Burnett River) forms the eastern boundary. The land in the locality rises toward the north with two peaks: Mount Gayndah in the south of the locality at 364 metres (1,194 ft) and an unnamed peak in the south-west at 340 metres (1,120 ft). A number of creeks rise in the locality and flow south or east to become tributaries of the Burnett River or Reid Creek respectively.

The more mountainous areas are undeveloped land. The predominant land use is grazing with some irrigated farming near the Burnett River.

== History ==
The locality takes its name from the Dirnbir railway station (25°36′24″S 151°33′31″E) on the now closed Mungar Junction to Monto branch railway. The Queensland Railways Department named the station on 28 February 1913 using an Aboriginal word meaning grey ironbark tree.

The Mount Debateable railway station was also located in the locality at 25°37′02″S 151°31′08″E, despite the mountain and locality of the same name being on the southern side of the Burnett River. Prior to August 1913, Mount Debateable railway station was known as Buckingah railway station.

Dirnbir State School opened 1915. It closed circa 1933. It was on a 5-acre-1-rood (2.1 ha) site near the Dirnbir railway station on Shepherds Road (approx 25.60525°S 151.56172°E).

== Demographics ==
In the 2016 census, Dirnbir had a population of 49 people.

In the 2021 census, Dirnbir had a population of 59 people.

== Education ==
There are no schools in Dirnbir. The nearest government primary school is Gayndah State School in neighbouring Gayndah to the west. The nearest government secondary school is the Burnett State College, also in Gayndah.

== Attractions ==
A viewing platform at McConnell Lookout provides panoramic views eastward and southward. It is 356 metres (1,168 ft) above sea level. There is much to observe on the drive to the lookout and once there the facilities included are public toilets, sheltered picnic tables, a fire pit, rubbish bins, car park, and information. The drive to the lookout has a steep gradient not suitable for caravans and large vehicles.

The Burnett River Bridges section of the Boyne Burnett Inland Rail Trail was opened on 10 September 2022 at Mt Debateable Railway Station, Mt Debateable Road, Gayndah. Sixteen kilometers of this section lies beside the Burnett River. The Red Gulley Bridge, Slab Creek Bridge, Spring Creek Bridge, Boomerang Bridge, Humphery Bridges Numbers 1, 2 ("Faith" Bridge or "bridge of faith"), and 3 and Roth's Bridge are passed on the way to the other end at Mundubbera Railway Precinct.

The Official Register of Engineering Heritage Markers listed Degilbo-Mundubbera Railway Bridges in October 2016. A total of 12 bridges, including some on this section of Rail Trail, are recognised with one Engineering Heritage Marker representing the "best example of a collection of historic railway bridges in Australia".
