= Harriet, Queensland =

Harriet
- Suburb
- Interactive map of Harriet
- Coordinates: 25.7441°S 151.5858°E
- Country: Australia
- State: Queensland
- LGA: North Burnett Region
- Location: 30.4 km (18.9 mi) SSW of Gayndah; 169 km (105 mi) WSW of Maryborough; 177 km (110 mi) NW of Gympie; 349 km (217 mi) NNW of Brisbane

Government
  - State electorate: Callide
  - Federal division: Flynn

Area
  - Total: 56.3 km^{2} (21.7 sq mi)

Population
  - Total: 0 (2021 census)
  - Density: 0.000/km^{2} (0.000/sq mi)
- Time zone: UTC+10:00 (AEST)
- Postcode: 4625
Suburbs around Harriet
Woodmillar	Woodmillar	Barlyne
Pile Gully	Harriet	Barlyne
Aranbanga	Aranbanga	Aranbanga

Harriet is a rural locality in the North Burnett Region, Queensland, Australia. In the 2021 census, Harriet had "no people or a very low population".

== Geography ==
The locality is bounded to the west by Aranbanga Creek. Harriet Creek rises in Aranbanga in the south and flows through the locality to the north where it becomes a tributary of Aranbanga Creek, a tributary of the Burnett River. The locality presumably takes its name from the creek.

== Demographics ==
In the 2016 census, Harriet had a population of 4 people.

In the 2021 census, Harriet had "no people or a very low population".

== Education ==
There are no schools in Harriet. The nearest government primary school is Gayndah State School in Gayndah to the north-east. The nearest government secondary school is Burnett State College, also in Gayndah.
