= Deep Creek, Queensland =

Deep Creek
- Suburb
- Interactive map of Deep Creek
- Coordinates: 25.6538°S 151.4761°E
- Country: Australia
- State: Queensland
- LGA: North Burnett Region
- Location: 16.6 km (10.3 mi) W of Gayndah; 19.9 km (12.4 mi) ESE of Mundubbera; 174 km (108 mi) NW of Gympie; 349 km (217 mi) NNW of Brisbane

Government
  - State electorate: Callide
  - Federal division: Flynn

Area
  - Total: 68.4 km^{2} (26.4 sq mi)

Population
  - Total: 13 (2021 census)
  - Density: 0.190/km^{2} (0.492/sq mi)
- Time zone: UTC+10:00 (AEST)
- Postcode: 4625
Suburbs around Deep Creek
Humphery	Humphery	Dirnbir
Glenrae	Deep Creek	Mount Debateable
Pile Gully	Pile Gully	Woodmillar

Deep Creek is a rural locality in the North Burnett Region, Queensland, Australia. In the 2021 census, Deep Creek had a population of 13 people.

== Geography ==
The Burnett River forms part of the northern boundary of the locality. A number of creeks rises in the south of the locality and flow to the north where they become tributaries of the Burnett River.

The Gayndah Mundubbera Road passes through the locality from the north-east (Mount Debateable) to the north-west (Glenrae).

The predominant land use is grazing, but there is some irrigated farming in the north of the locality near the Burnett River.

== Demographics ==
In the 2016 census, Deep Creek had a population of 16 people.

In the 2021 census, Deep Creek had a population of 13 people.

== Education ==
There are no schools in Deep Creek. The nearest government primary schools are Gayndah State School in Gayndah to the east and Mundubbera State College in Mundubbera to the north-west. The nearest government secondary schools are Burnett State College in Gayndah (to Year 12) and Mundubbera State College (to Year 10).
