= Boyne Burnett Inland Rail Trail =

Trail in Queensland, Australia

The Boyne Burnett Inland Rail Trail is a recreational route for walkers, cyclists and horse riders from Taragoola (near Calliope) to Gayndah. It uses the closed Gladstone to Monto and Mungar Junction to Monto railway corridors in Queensland, Australia.

== Route ==
Only two sections of the Trail have been opened, up to September 2022. The Burnett River Bridges section is 170 kilometres (110 mi) south of the Dawes Range Tunnel section. Waterways may be impassable after rain, as the bridges are not usable.

=== Dawes Range Tunnel section ===
The 26.28-kilometre (16.33 mi) Dawes Range Tunnel section starts at Barrimoon Siding, Kalpowar and finishes at Builyan, Boyne Valley. This section contains 6 tunnels between Barrimoon Siding and Golembil Siding. Between Barrimoon Siding to Golembil Siding through the Dawes Range there are also views of mountains and both cuttings and tunnels to see. The trail also passes the historic township of Many Peaks with its Local Heritage listed attractions. Camping before the start is available in Kalpowar State Forest at Kalpowar camping area (Gladstone) or in Pine Street, Kalpowar. Camping is available in Builyan at the finish.

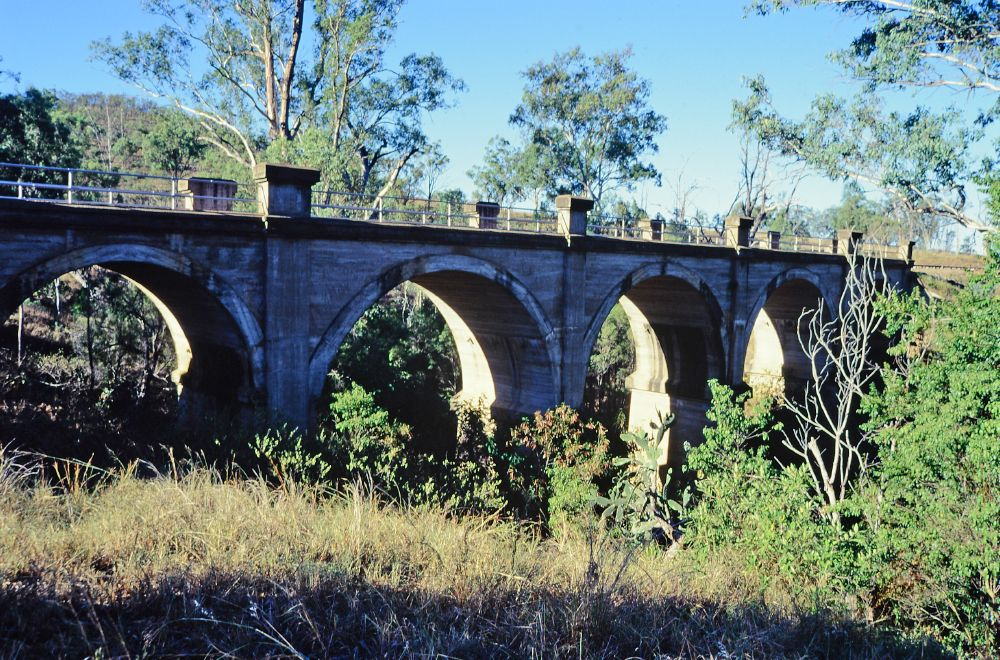
Humphery Railway Bridge, also known as Faith Bridge

=== Burnett River Bridges section ===
Heading west from the Trail head at Mt Debateable Railway Siding, Mt Debateable Road, Gayndah, the Burnett River Bridges section traverses 30.4 kilometres (18.9 mi). The Red Gulley Bridge, Slab Creek Bridge, Spring Creek Bridge, Boomerang Bridge, Humphery Bridges Numbers 1, 2 ("Faith" Bridge or "bridge of faith") and 3 and Roth's Bridge are passed on the way to Mundubbera.

Heading east from the Trail head are the remains of Reids Ck Bridge. The distance is a total of 14.2 kilometres (8.8 mi), there and back.

Optionally the 23.34-kilometre (14.50 mi) Sleeping Giant Loop Trail leaves the Reid Creek trail at Dirnbir siding and goes along Dirnbir Road and Mt Debateable Road to return to the Trail head. The Loop Trail includes a diversion to McConnell Lookout and Park along Renay Robinson Dve, which has a gradient of 12%. Facilities at the Lookout include public toilets, sheltered picnic tables, a fire pit, rubbish bins, car park, and information.

== Geography ==
=== Dawes Range Tunnel section ===
The Dawes Range Tunnel section starts in the Boyne River Valley. It passes through the Glassford State Forest and the Dawes Range, and finishes in Barrimoon which adjoins Kalpowar State Forest. It crosses Glassford Creek which is a tributary of the Boyne River, and Coppermine and Boggy Creeks which are tributaries of Glassford Creek.

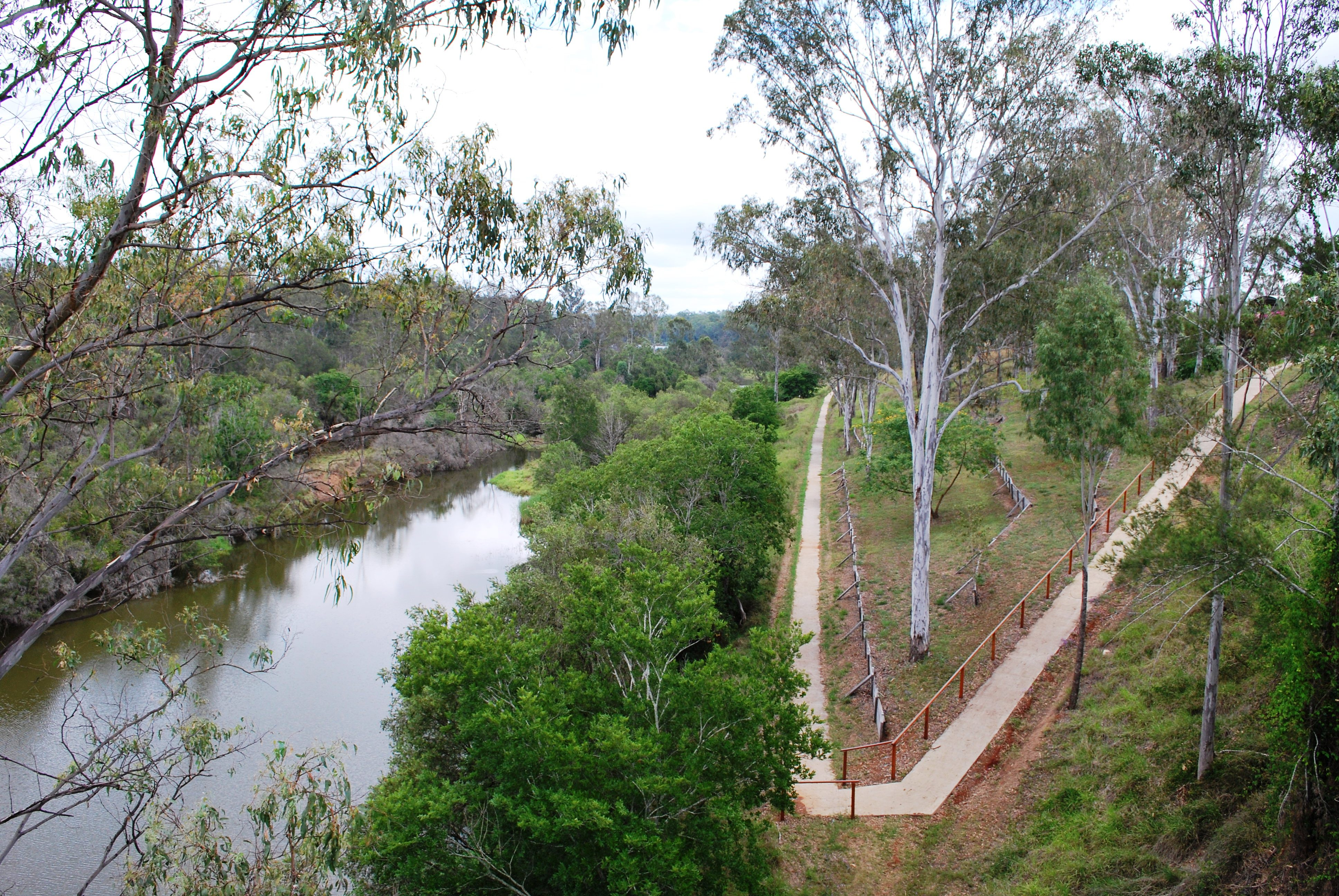
Riverside Walk and Burnett River at Mundubbera

The Boyne River drainage sub-basin contains the towns of Barmundi, Benaraby, Boyne Island, Boynedale, Builyan, Golembil, Little More, Many Peaks, Nagoorin, Rodds Bay, Tannum Sands, Taragoola, Ubobo and Wietalaba. This drainage sub-basin should not be confused with the Boyne & Auburn Rivers drainage sub-basin which drains into the Burnett River west of Mundubbera.

=== Burnett River Bridges section ===
The Burnett River Bridges section passes through a region of citrus orchards. Sixteen kilometres of it lies beside the Burnett River on one side, and the slopes leading up to the southern end of the Binjour Plateau on the other side. The Burnett River drains a basin covering 33,210 square kilometres (12,820 sq mi) - 1.9% of the total area of Queensland.

The Queensland lungfish, a living fossil, can live for several days out of the water if it is kept moist, and is native to the Burnett River. While lungfish and platypus would be rare sightings, koalas might be spotted in the eucalypt forest beside the trail.

== History ==
From 2012, conversion of the corridor to a multi-use rail trail was discussed. Boyne Burnett Inland Rail Trail was incorporated in July 2018 and its stated goal was to "attract increasingly significant visitor numbers to the Trail and adjacent communities in coming years". Soon afterwards a $99,000 feasibility study was fully funded through the Queensland Government's Queensland Cycling Action Plan.

Gladstone Regional Council and North Burnett Regional Council received the Final Report in March 2019. Subsequently concept designs and a draft master plan were drawn up and extensive community engagement was undertaken.

The Dawes Range Tunnel section of the Boyne Burnett Inland Rail Trail was opened on 11 September 2021.

The Burnett River Bridges section of the Boyne Burnett Inland Rail Trail was opened on 10 September 2022.

== Heritage listing ==
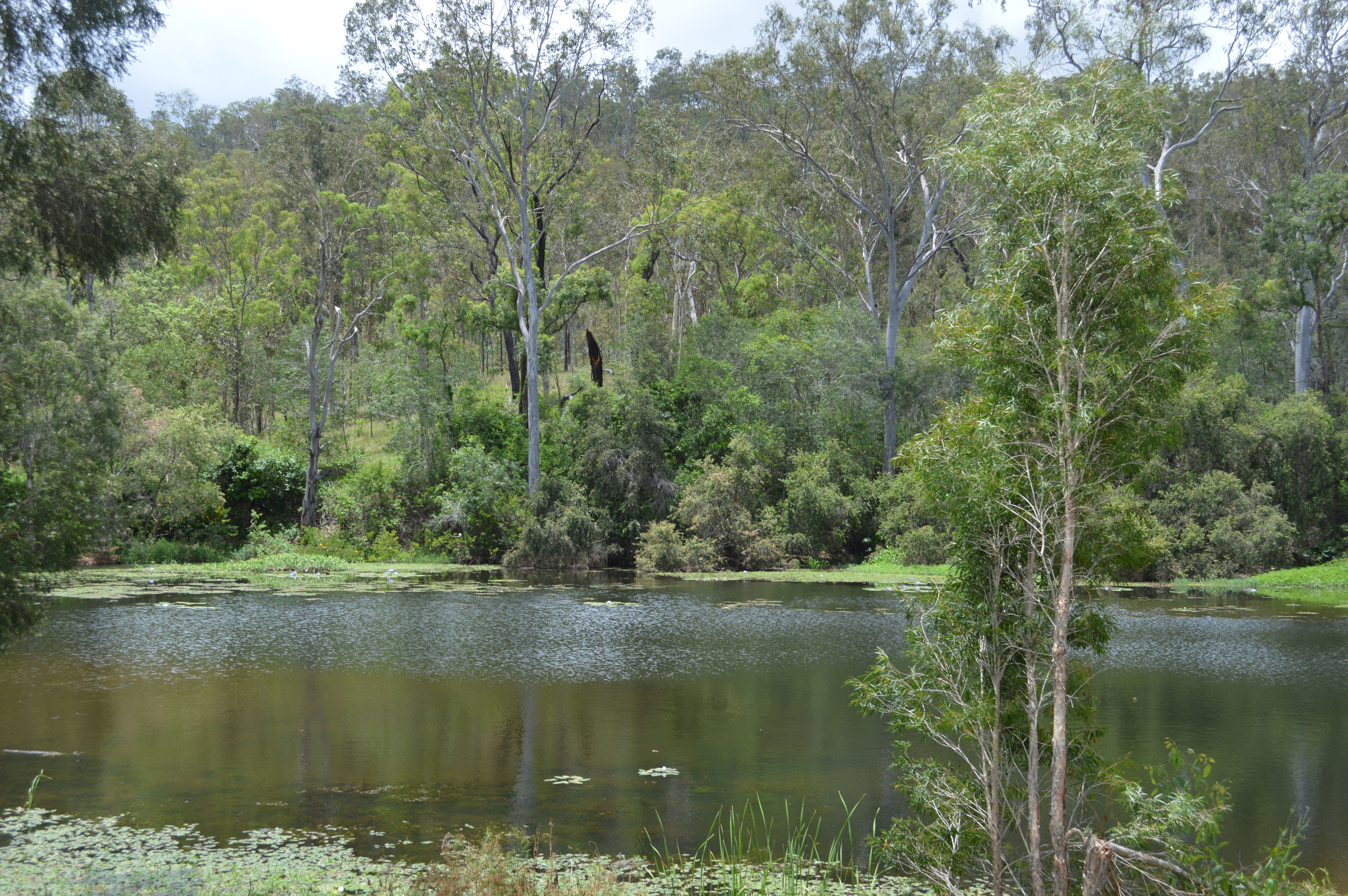
Many Peaks Railway Dam, completed in 1912.

The Queensland Heritage Register listed

- Humphery Railway Bridge on 21 October 1992

The Local Heritage Register of Gladstone Regional Council listed

- Many Peaks / Barrimoon Railway Tunnels
- Many Peaks Railway Complex
- Many Peaks Road Bridge
- Many Peaks Railway Dam. While not on the rail trail the dam is accessed by getting on to the (very low traffic) bitumen road at Many Peaks and riding back less than a kilometre. There is a new shelter shed, history information signage, toilet block and elevated lookout over the old weir. There is no drinking water available.

The Official Register of Engineering Heritage Markers listed

- Degilbo-Mundubbera Railway Bridges in October 2016. A total of 12 bridges, some of which are on the Bridges section of rail trail, are situated on the Mungar to Mundubbera rail line and are recognized with one Engineering Heritage Marker representing the “best example of a collection of historic railway bridges in Australia”.

== See also ==
- List of rail trails in Australia
- Cycling infrastructure
- Rail trail
- Mountain biking
- Trail riding
