= The Limits, Queensland =

The Limits
- Suburb
- Interactive map of The Limits
- Coordinates: 25.6747°S 151.6677°E
- Country: Australia
- State: Queensland
- LGA: North Burnett Region
- Location: 8.3 km (5.2 mi) SE of Gayndah; 152 km (94 mi) SW of Bundaberg; 162 km (101 mi) WSW of Hervey Bay; 368 km (229 mi) NNW of Brisbane

Government
  - State electorate: Callide
  - Federal division: Flynn

Area
  - Total: 26.6 km^{2} (10.3 sq mi)

Population
  - Total: 0 (2021 census)
  - Density: 0.000/km^{2} (0.00/sq mi)
- Time zone: UTC+10:00 (AEST)
- Postcode: 4625
Suburbs around The Limits
Gayndah	Gayndah	Campbell Creek
Woodmillar	The Limits	Campbell Creek
Barlyne	Penwhaupell	Campbell Creek

The Limits is a rural locality in the North Burnett Region, Queensland, Australia. In the 2021 census, The Limits had "no people or a very low population".

== Geography ==
The locality is loosely bounded to the west by Oaky Creek.

Most of The Limits is mountainous terrain ranging from 120 to 420 metres (390 to 1,380 ft) above sea level with the lower flatter areas in the north-east of the locality.

The land use is predominantly grazing on native vegetation.

== History ==
The origin of the name is unclear but the Von Cronholm family were fruit growers at "The Limit" (singular) from at least 1936.

== Demographics ==
In the 2016 census, The Limits had a population of 4 people.

In the 2021 census, The Limits had "no people or a very low population".

== Education ==
There are no schools in The Limits. The nearest government primary school is Gayndah State School in neighbouring Gayndah to the north-west. The nearest government secondary school is Burnett State College, also in Gayndah.
