= Glenrae, Queensland =

Glenrae
- Suburb
- Interactive map of Glenrae
- Coordinates: 25.6441°S 151.3705°E
- Country: Australia
- State: Queensland
- LGA: North Burnett Region
- Location: 10.3 km (6.4 mi) SSE of Mundubbera; 39.7 km (24.7 mi) W of Gayndah; 187 km (116 mi) SW of Bundaberg; 371 km (231 mi) NW of Brisbane

Government
  - State electorate: Callide
  - Federal division: Flynn

Area
  - Total: 105.1 km^{2} (40.6 sq mi)

Population
  - Total: 63 (2021 census)
  - Density: 0.599/km^{2} (1.553/sq mi)
- Time zone: UTC+10:00 (AEST)
- Postcode: 4626
Suburbs around Glenrae
Mundubbera	Philpott	Humphery
Boynewood	Glenrae	Deep Creek
Derri Derra	Old Cooranga	Pile Gully

Glenrae is a rural locality in the North Burnett Region, Queensland, Australia. In the 2021 census, Glenrae had a population of 63 people.

== History ==
Glenrae State School (sometimes called Glen Rae State School) opened on 16 March 1914 and closed in 1963. It was on the north-west corner of the junction of Glenrae Dip Road and Back Glenrae Road (approx 25.65384°S 151.34604°E).

== Demographics ==
In the 2016 census, Glenrae had a population of 83 people.

In the 2021 census, Glenrae had a population of 63 people.

== Education ==
There are no schools in Glenrae. The nearest government primary school are Boynewood State School in neighbouring Boynewood to the west and Mundubbera State College in neighbouring Mundubbera to the north-west. The nearest government secondary schools are Mundubbera State College (to Year 10) and Burnett State College (to Year 12) in Gayndah to the east.
