= Mungar Junction to Monto railway line =

Former railway line in Queensland, Australia

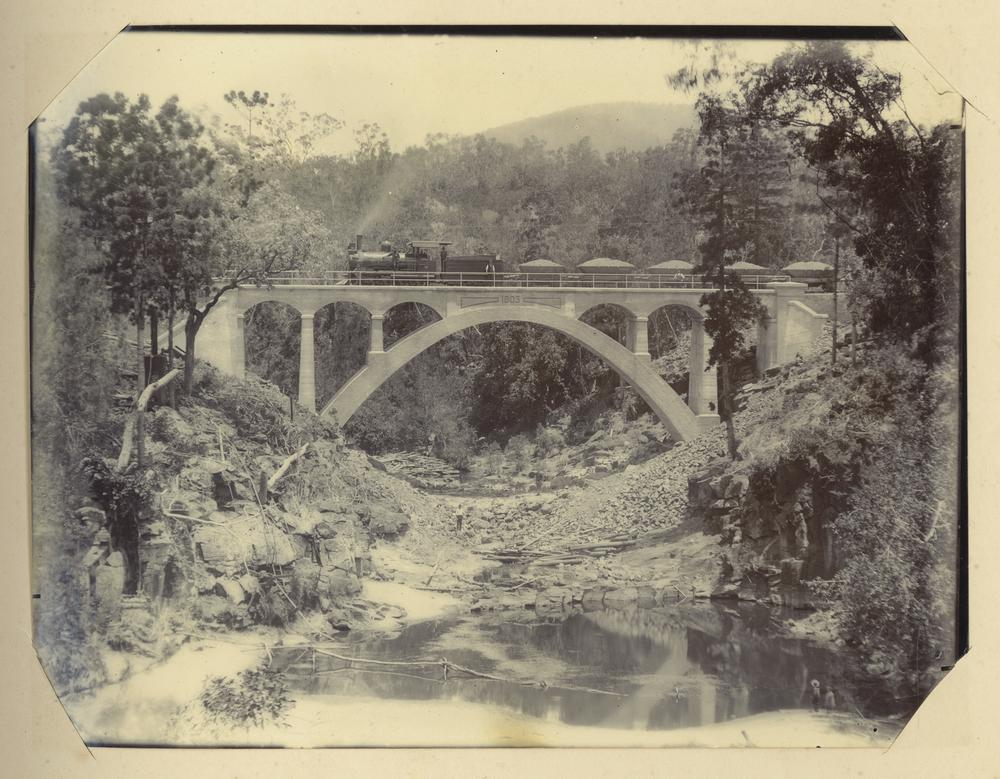
What appears to be a ballast train crossing over the completed Deep Creek railway bridge, Gayndah district, 1905. The bridge is on the section from Degilbo to Wetheron

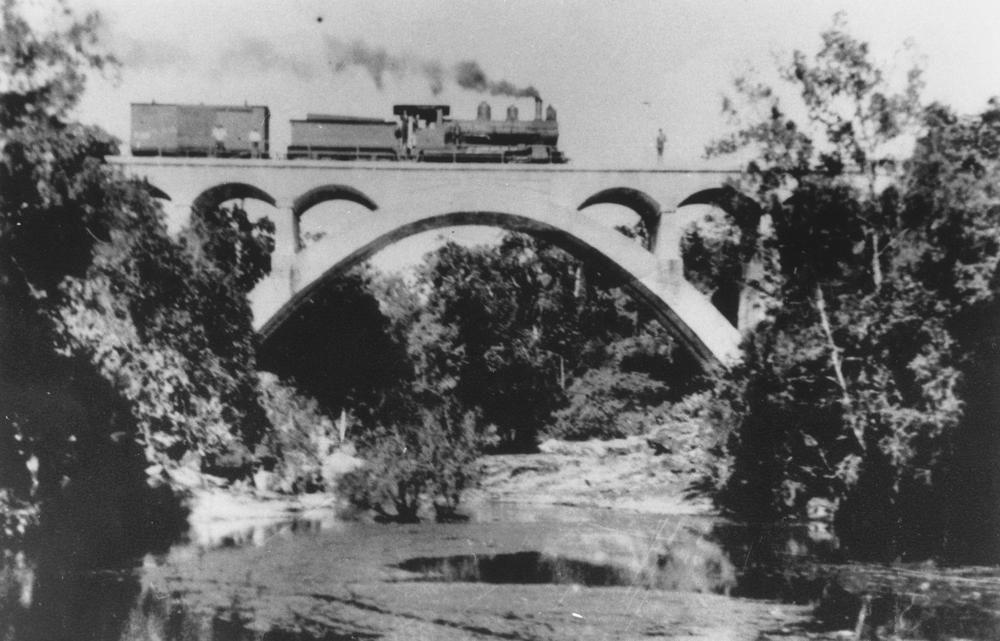
Chowey Bridge near Biggenden, 1905

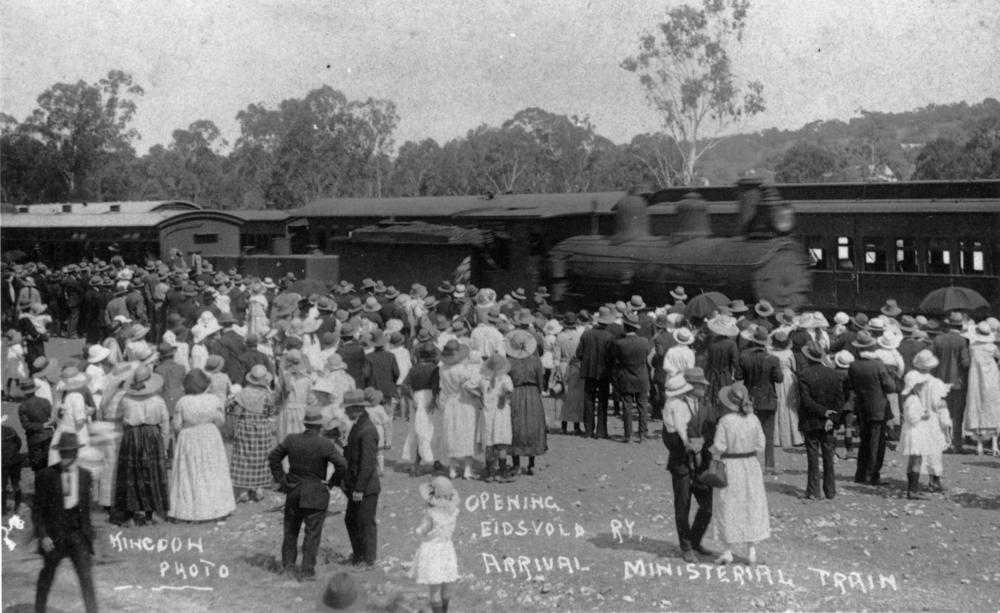
Ministerial train arrives at Eidsvold, ~1920

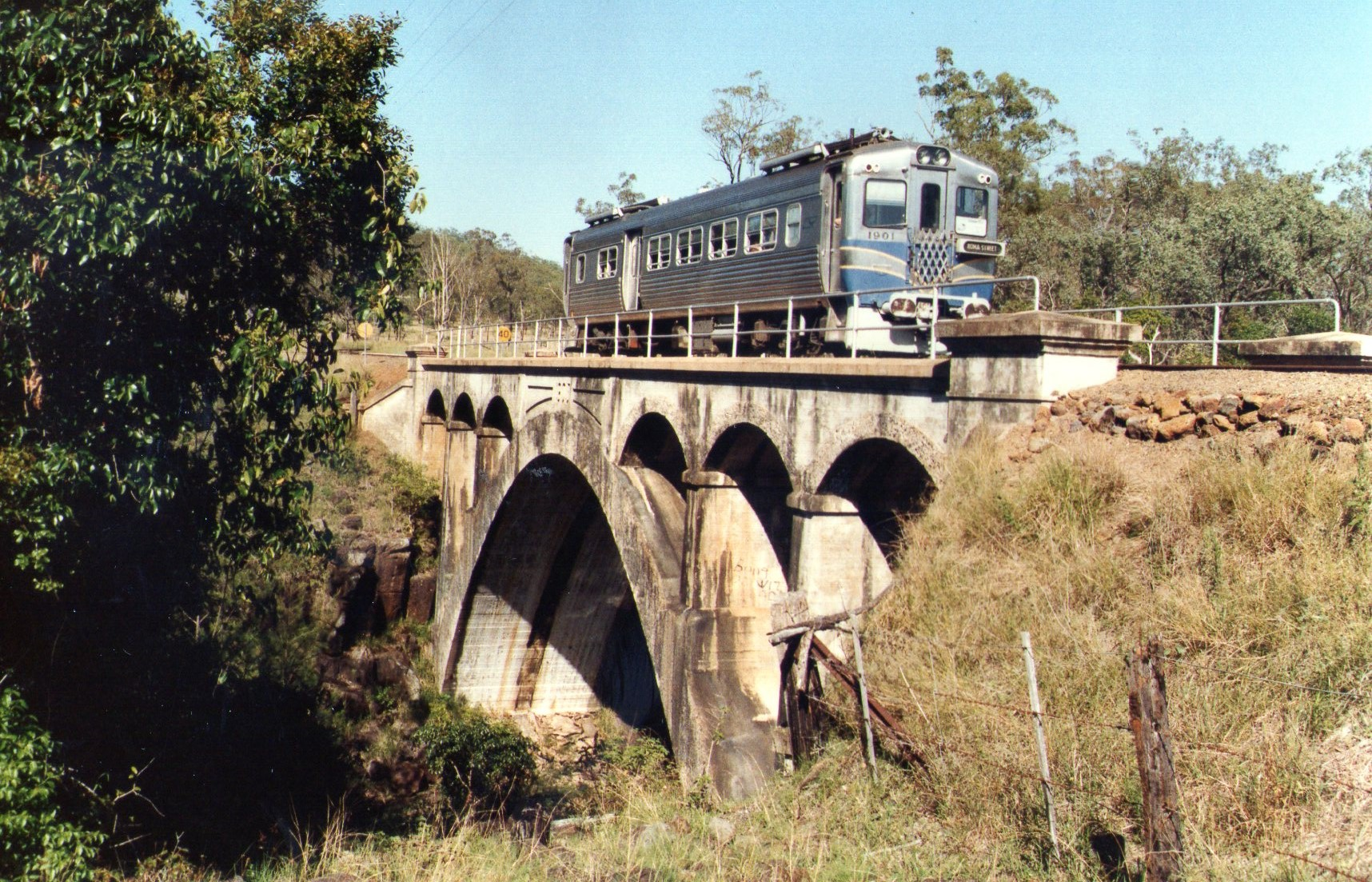
RM 1901 crossing the 1905 cast concrete Deep Creek bridge near Gayndah, one of the first such structures in Queensland

The Mungar Junction to Monto railway line is a 267-kilometre (166 mi) railway in Queensland, Australia. Progressively opened in eleven stages between 1889 and 1928 the line branched from the North Coast line at Mungar Junction a short distance west of Maryborough and followed a westerly route towards Biggenden and Gayndah before turning north via Mundubbera and Eidsvold to Monto. It is also known as the Gayndah Monto Branch Railway. In 2012, the line was officially closed.

== History ==
Whilst Bundaberg was chosen as the port for a rail line to Mount Perry, Maryborough was selected as the port for a line to the Central and Upper Burnett districts of Queensland, where minerals had been found.

== Opening ==
=== To Brooweena ===
The first section from Mungar Junction to Brooweena was opened on 29 July 1889, with sidings established at Pilerwa, Yerra, Thinoomba, Hunter's Hut and Aramara. Originally called Teebar and later known as Clifton and then Woocoo, Brooweena (perhaps an Aboriginal word for "crab" or "crayfish") acquired that name in 1890. Brooweena has always relied heavily on the local sawmill and the railway provided ready transport of timber.

=== To Boompa, Biggenden and Degilbo ===
Opened on 1 March 1891 the second stage brought the line a short distance to Boompa and, on 13 April 1891, via Lakeside (25.5763°S 152.1263°E) to the larger settlement of Biggenden. The fourth stage saw the line opened a short distance west of Biggenden to Degilbo (then known as Woowoonga) on 1 April 1893. A very busy railhead thrived and goods were reconsigned by wagon to the likes of Gayndah, Mundubbera and Eidsvold.

=== To Wetheron and Gayndah ===
The next two stages were opened to Wetheron on 21 December 1905 and to Gayndah on 16 December 1907. The line passed through small sidings at Muan, Chowey, Didcot, Gooroolba and Byrnestown en route to Wetheron and at Mount Lawless, Dappil and Ideraway en route to Gayndah. Gayndah apparently takes its name from the local Aboriginal word for "thunder" and is at the heart of a large citrus growing area. It is Queensland's oldest provincial town and was once favoured to be the state capital.

The heritage-listed Deep Creek Railway Bridge is between the Muan and Chowey sidings, designed while William Pagan was Chief Engineer.

=== To Boomerang and Mundubbera ===
Some six years passed before the seventh stage to Boomerang was opened on 1 November 1913 passing through Banapan, Dirnbir, Mount Debateable and Humphery. The next stage saw the opening of the line to Philpott Creek and Mundubbera on 3 February 1914. Freight transport increased as two sawmills consigned timber east and frequent shipments of cattle and pigs occurred.

The Mount Debateable railway station was original known as Buckingah railway station until it was renamed in August 1913.

=== To Ceratodus, Mulgildie and Monto ===
The balance of the line to Monto was opened in three stages – to Ceratodus on 26 April 1924, to Mulgildie on 20 June 1927 and finally to Monto on 15 September 1928. Stops were established at Lacon, Riverleigh, O’Bil Bil, Malmoe, Grosvenor and Eidsvold en route to Ceratodus as part of stage nine. Ceratodus takes its name from the lungfish (neoceratodus forsteri) an air-breathing fish which inhabits the nearby Burnett River. The Archer brothers settled the Eidsvold region in 1848. Although of Scottish origin, they later moved to Norway. Eidsvold is named after a small Norwegian town where that country's constitution was signed. Sidings were built at Jirette, Cynthia, Abercorn, Anyarro, Kapaldo and Selene when stage ten to Mulgildie (spelt "Mulgeldie" until 1945 ) was completed. The eleventh and final stage saw the line terminate via Three Moon at Monto.

The journey from Brisbane to Monto by mixed train took some fourteen hours, and three times a week a sleeping car connected with the mail train at Mungar, taking twenty-one hours.

== Other lines ==
In addition to the Mungar Junction to Monto line, the Queensland government decided to construct two other lines to Monto. The first is the branch line from Byellee (near Gladstone) that travels south-west to Monto, opened between 1910 and 1931. Completion of that line thus provided a semi-circular inland link between Maryborough and Gladstone. Because light track was laid between Mungar Junction and Mundubbera, the route was never an alternative when floods or derailments blocked the North Coast line.

The other planned line to Monto from Rockhampton was commenced but never completed. A line from Rannes and Thangool (the Callide Valley Branch Railway) terminated at Lawgi when construction ceased as a result of the Great Depression.

== Later years ==
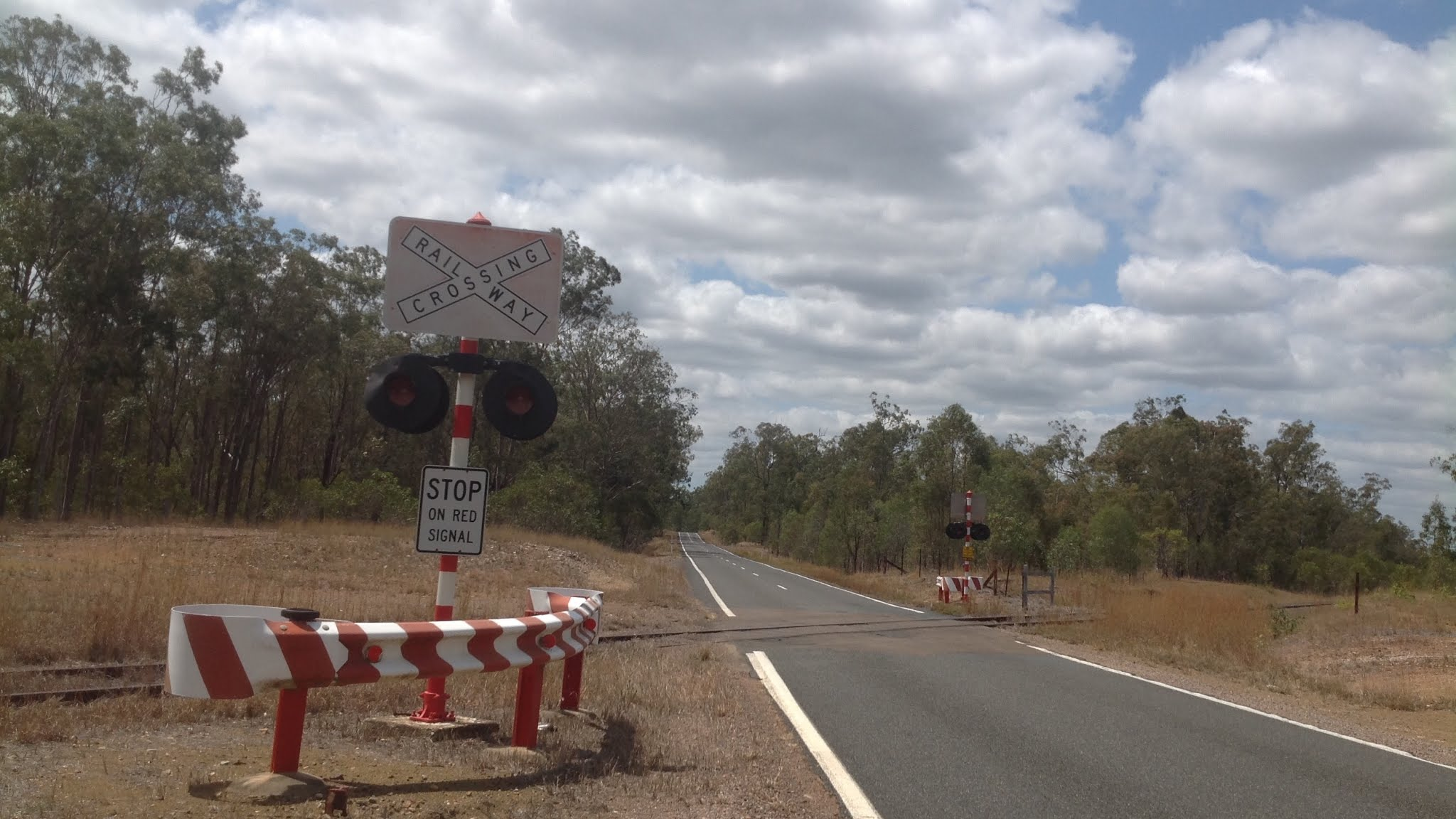
Disused Level Crossing on the disused railway line in Aramara, Queensland, Australia. Photo taken on 29 September 2018.

In later years, the line no longer had a passenger service, with goods traffic being mainly timber and agricultural produce. The discovery of coal near Monto raised hopes of increased rail traffic. The Gladstone - Monto line went out of service in 2002, but was maintained to preserve it for mineral transportation in the future. The railway line from Maryborough to Monto was maintained and once a week a goods train went to Monto and back carrying timber and sometimes molasses but gradually loads were being refused and eventually the trains ceased and the railway line became completely unused after the last train, a celebratory journey on an old steam train, came through from Monto to Maryborough in 2005.

== Closure ==
The last train on the railway line was in 2008 and in 2012 the line was officially closed.

Following the massive flooding events of 2010 and 2013 in the North Burnett Region, the railway bridges and lines were damaged and in 2017 the Queensland Government decided to remove the entire railway and infrastructure. All the railway lines and fittings were torn up and sold off.

== Rail trail ==
The Dawes Range Tunnel section of the Boyne Burnett Inland Rail Trail was opened on 11 September 2021. The 26.28-kilometre (16.33 mi) section starts at Barrimoon Siding, Kalpowar and finishes at Builyan, Boyne Valley. This section contains 6 tunnels between Barrimoon Siding and Golembil Siding. It also passes the historic township of Many Peaks with its Local Heritage listed attractions - the Many Peaks Railway Complex, Many Peaks Railway Dam and Many Peaks Road Bridge.

The 37.58-kilometre (23.35 mi) Burnett River Bridges section of the Boyne Burnett Inland Rail Trail was opened on 10 September 2022 at Mt Debateable Railway Siding, Mt Debateable Road, Gayndah. Sixteen kilometers of it lies beside the Burnett River. Travelling west from the Trail head Red Gulley Bridge, Slab Creek Bridge, Spring Creek Bridge, Boomerang Bridge, Humphery Bridges Numbers 1, 2 ("Faith" Bridge or "bridge of faith"), and 3 and Roth's Bridge are passed on the way to the other end at Mundubbera Railway Precinct. The Official Register of Engineering Heritage Markers listed Degilbo-Mundubbera Railway Bridges in October 2016. A total of 12 bridges on this section of Rail Trail are recognized with one Engineering Heritage Marker representing the "best example of a collection of historic railway bridges in Australia".

== See also ==
- Rail transport in Queensland
