= Woodmillar =

- Suburb
- Interactive map of Woodmillar
- Coordinates: 25.6733°S 151.5927°E
- Country: Australia
- State: Queensland
- LGA: North Burnett Region
- Location: 6.6 km (4.1 mi) SW of Gayndah; 154 km (96 mi) SW of Bundaberg; 156 km (97 mi) W of Maryborough; 330 km (210 mi) NNW of Brisbane

Government
  - State electorate: Callide
  - Federal division: Flynn

Area
  - Total: 82.9 km^{2} (32.0 sq mi)

Population
  - Total: 106 (2021 census)
  - Density: 1.279/km^{2} (3.312/sq mi)
- Time zone: UTC+10:00 (AEST)
- Postcode: 4625
Suburbs around Woodmillar
Mount Debateable	Mount Debateable	Gayndah
Deep Creek	Woodmillar	The Limits
Pile Gully	Harriet	Barlyne

Woodmillar is a rural locality in the North Burnett Region, Queensland, Australia. In the 2021 census, Woodmillar had a population of 106 people.

== History ==
Woodmillar State School opened on 15 November 1915. It closed circa December 1960. It was at 8 Langs Road (25.67072°S 151.57118°E).

== Demographics ==
In the 2016 census, Woodmillar had a population of 116 people.

In the 2021 census, Woodmillar had a population of 106 people.

== Education ==
There are no schools in Woodmillar. The nearest government primary and secondary schools are Gayndah State School and Burnett State College respectively, both in neighbouring Gayndah to the north-east.
