= Penwhaupell, Queensland =

Penwhaupell
- Suburb
- Interactive map of Penwhaupell
- Coordinates: 25.74°S 151.7261°E
- Country: Australia
- State: Queensland
- LGA: North Burnett Region
- Location: 24.5 km (15.2 mi) SW of Coalstoun Lakes; 26.7 km (16.6 mi) SE of Gayndah; 140 km (87 mi) NW of Gympie; 312 km (194 mi) NNW of Brisbane

Government
  - State electorate: Callide
  - Federal division: Flynn

Area
  - Total: 85.0 km^{2} (32.8 sq mi)

Population
  - Total: 0 (2021 census)
  - Density: 0.000/km^{2} (0.000/sq mi)
- Time zone: UTC+10:00 (AEST)
- Postcode: 4625
Suburbs around Penwhaupell
The Limits	Campbell Creek	Ban Ban
Barlyne	Penwhaupell	Booubyjan
Aranbanga	Aranbanga	Booubyjan

Penwhaupell is a rural locality in the North Burnett Region, Queensland, Australia. In the 2021 census, Penwhaupell had "no people or a very low population".

== Geography ==
Barambah Creek enters the locality from the south-east (Aranbanga / Booubyjan) and forms the south-eastern boundary of the locality before flowing north-east (Ban Ban).

Penwhaupell Road enters the locality from the south (Aranbanga) and exits to the north-east (Ban Ban) whre it is known as The Ridges Road.

The land use is predominantly grazing on native vegetation with a small amount of crop growing in the south.

== Demographics ==
In the 2016 census, Penwhaupell had "no people or a very low population".

In the 2021 census, Penwhaupell had "no people or a very low population".

== Education ==
There are no schools in Penwhaupell. The nearest government primary school is Coalstoun Lakes State School in Coalstoun Lakes to the north-east. The nearest government secondary school is Burnett State College in Gayndah to the north-west.
