= Mount Debateable, Queensland =

Mount Debateable
- Suburb
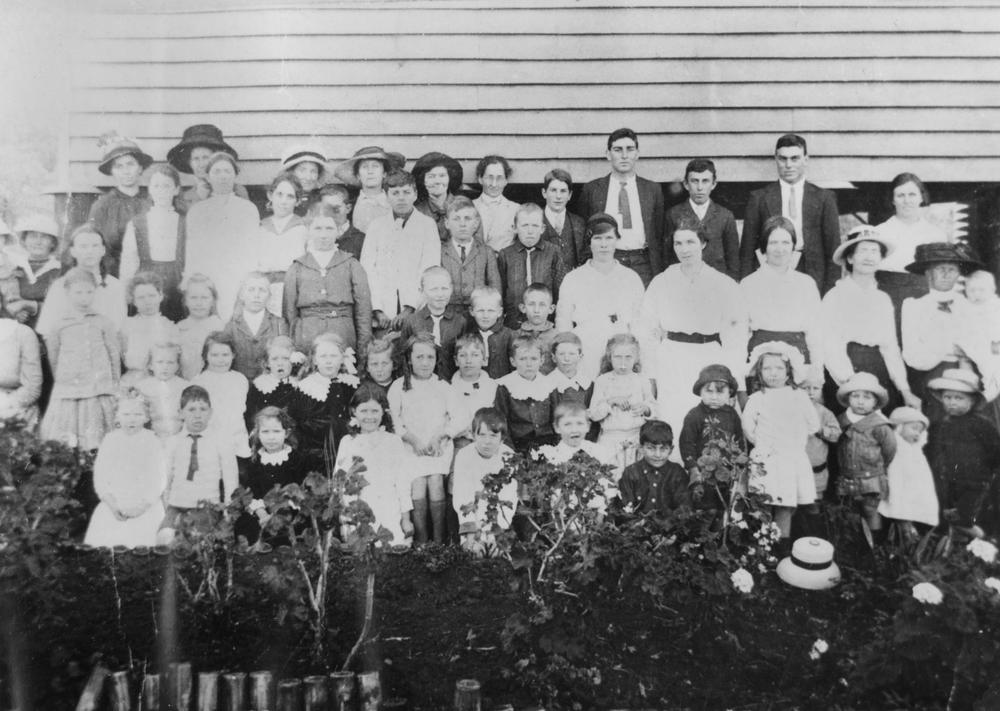
- Pupils and families from the Mt Debateable State School, 1914

- Interactive map of Mount Debateable
- Coordinates: 25.6316°S 151.5566°E
- Country: Australia
- State: Queensland
- LGA: North Burnett Region
- Location: 3.7 km (2.3 mi) W of Gayndah; 150 km (93 mi) SW of Bundaberg; 162 km (101 mi) WSW of Hervey Bay; 339 km (211 mi) NNW of Brisbane

Government
  - State electorate: Callide
  - Federal division: Flynn

Area
  - Total: 21.4 km^{2} (8.3 sq mi)

Population
  - Total: 40 (2021 census)
  - Density: 1.87/km^{2} (4.8/sq mi)
- Time zone: UTC+10:00 (AEST)
- Postcode: 4625
Suburbs around Mount Debateable
Dirnbir	Dirnbir	Dirnbir
Deep Creek	Mount Debateable	Gayndah
Woodmillar	Woodmillar	Woodmillar

Mount Debateable is a rural locality in the North Burnett Region, Queensland, Australia. In the 2021 census, Mount Debateable had a population of 40 people.

== Geography ==
The Burnett River forms the northern boundary of the locality.

The Gayndah Mundubbera Road passes through the locality from east (Gayndah) to west (Deep Creek).

Despite the name, the Mount Debateable railway station is not in the locality but in Dirnbir north of the river. It was originally known as Buckingah railway station until August 1913. It was on the now-closed Mungar Junction to Monto railway line.

There are two peaks in the locality:

- Mount Debateable in the north of the locality (25.6253°S 151.5600°E) at 261 metres (856 ft) above sea level
- White Hill in the north-east of the locality (25.6189°S 151.5783°E) at 122 metres (400 ft)

The predominant land use is grazing with some irrigated cropping near the Burnett River.

== History ==
The locality takes its name from the mountain, which in turn takes its name from the Mount Debateable pastoral run taken up in 1851 by George Mocatta. Although it is sometimes written as Mount Debatable, in February 1987, the Queensland Place Names Board confirmed the official spelling to be Mount Debateable.

In January 1912, tenders were called to build Mount Debateable State School. In 1926, the school building was relocated to a new site about 3 miles (4.8 km) away and the school was renamed Granite Hill State School. A new school building was constructed in 1929. The school closed in 1957.

== Demographics ==
In the 2016 census, Mount Debateable had a population of 54 people.

In the 2021 census, Mount Debateable had a population of 40 people.

== Education ==
There are no schools in Mount Debateable. The nearest government primary and secondary schools are Gayndah State School and Burnett State College, both in neighbouring Gayndah to the east.
