= List of rail trails in Australia =

This is a list of rail trails in Australia. It does not include proposed trails.

Name	State	Length	Location	Accessibility										Ref
Name	State	Length	Location	Walking	Mountain biking	Horse riding	Touring hybrid cycling	Four wheel driving	Wheelchair suitable	Pram suitable	In-line skating and scooters	Two wheel drive following	Dogs on leash allowed	Ref
Boyne Burnett Inland Rail Trail, Dawes Range Section	Queensland	26.28 km (16.33 mi)	38.4 km (23.9 mi) southwest from Miriam Vale	●	●	●								
Boyne Burnett Inland Rail Trail, Burnett River Bridges Section	Queensland	37.58 km (23.35 mi)	152.7 km (94.9 mi) west of Maryborough, Queensland	●	●	●								
Adelaide Hills Amy Gillett Rail Trail	South Australia	16 km (9.9 mi)	0 km (0 mi) from Mount Lofty Ranges	●	●	●	●		●	●	●			
Ballarat-Skipton Rail Trail	Victoria	57 km (35 mi)	110 km (68 mi) northwest of Melbourne	●	●		●							
Bass Coast Rail Trail	Victoria	23 km (14 mi)	130 km (81 mi) south-east of Melbourne	●	●	●	●		●	●				
Bellarine Rail Trail	Victoria	32.5 km (20.2 mi)	75 km (47 mi) of Melbourne	●	●		●		●	●				
Parramatta to Liverpool Railside Trail	New South Wales	14 km (8.7 mi)	20 km (12 mi) west of Sydney	●	●		●		●	●	●			
Brisbane Valley Rail Trail	Queensland	161 km (100 mi)	70 km (43 mi) west of Brisbane	●	●	●								
Camperdown to Timboon Rail Trail	Victoria	40 km (25 mi)	160 km (99 mi) southwest of Melbourne	●	●	●								
Inner Circle Rail Trail	Victoria	4 km (2.5 mi)	5 km (3.1 mi) from Melbourne	●	●		●		●	●	●	●		
Coast to Vines Rail Trail	South Australia	37 km (23 mi)	0 km (0 mi) from southern Adelaide	●	●	●	●		●	●	●			
East Gippsland Rail Trail	Victoria	94 km (58 mi)	280 km (170 mi) east of Melbourne	●	●	●	●							
Fernleigh Track – Adamstown to Belmont Rail Trail	New South Wales	16 km (9.9 mi)	160 km (99 mi) south of Sydney	●	●		●		●	●	●			
Gippsland Lakes Discovery Trail	Victoria	17 km (11 mi)	315 km (196 mi) east of Melbourne	●	●		●							
Gippsland Plains Rail Trail	Victoria	63 km (39 mi)	190 km (120 mi) east of Melbourne	●	●	●	●							
Wolgan Valley Rail Trail	New South Wales	11 km (6.8 mi)	66 km (41 mi) north from Blue Mountains	●	●									
Grand Ridge Rail Trail	Victoria	13 km (8.1 mi)	160 km (99 mi) east of Melbourne	●	●	●	●							
Great Southern Rail Trail and Tarra Trail	Victoria	74 km (46 mi)	130 km (81 mi) east of Melbourne	●	●	●	●		●	●				
Great Victorian Rail Trail	Victoria	134 km (83 mi)	110 km (68 mi) north of Melbourne	●	●	●	●		●	●				
Mary to the Bay Rail Trail	Queensland	13.5 km (8.4 mi)	288 km (179 mi) north of Brisbane	●	●		●		●	●	●			
High Country Rail Trail	Victoria	65 km (40 mi)	300 km (190 mi) northeast of Melbourne	●	●	●	●		●					
Barossa Trail	South Australia	10 km (6.2 mi)	0 km (0 mi) from Barossa Valley	●	●		●		●	●	●			
Lilydale to Warburton Rail Trail	Victoria	40 km (25 mi)	35 km (22 mi) east of Melbourne	●	●	●	●			●				
Nurragi Conservation Reserve	South Australia	12 km (7.5 mi)	70 km (43 mi) southeast of Adelaide	●										
Murray to the Mountains Rail Trail	Victoria	116 km (72 mi)	250 km (160 mi) northeast of Melbourne	●	●		●		●	●				
O'Keefe Rail Trail	Victoria	50 km (31 mi)	150 km (93 mi) northeast of Melbourne	●	●		●							
Old Beechy Rail Trail	Victoria	50 km (31 mi)	152 km (94 mi) southwest of Melbourne	●	●									
Outer Circle Rail Trail	Victoria	15 km (9.3 mi)	6 km (3.7 mi) east of Melbourne	●	●		●		●	●	●			
Port Fairy-Warrnambool Rail Trail	Victoria	37 km (23 mi)	260 km (160 mi) southwest of Melbourne	●	●		●							
Railway Reserves Heritage Trail	Western Australia	82 km (51 mi)	19 km (12 mi) east of Perth	●	●	●								
Red Hill Rail Trail	Victoria	6.5 km (4.0 mi)	90 km (56 mi) south of Melbourne	●	●	●	●							
Belgrave Railway Trail	Victoria	12.5 km (7.8 mi)	40 km (25 mi) east of Melbourne	●	●		●		●	●	●			
Rosstown Railway Heritage Trail	Victoria	7 km (4.3 mi)	9 km (5.6 mi) south of Melbourne	●	●		●		●	●	●	●		
Sandridge Railway Trail	Victoria	5 km (3.1 mi)	1 km (0.62 mi) south of Melbourne	●	●		●		●	●	●	●		
Tyers Junction Rail Trail	Victoria	11 km (6.8 mi)	30 km (19 mi) north of Moe	●	●	●								
Walhalla Goldfields Rail Trail and Moondarra Rail Trail	Victoria	7 km (4.3 mi)	165 km (103 mi) east Of Melbourne	●	●	●	●							
Westside Bike Path	South Australia	9 km (5.6 mi)	2 km (1.2 mi) west of Adelaide	●	●		●		●	●	●			
Moe - Yallourn Rail Trail	Victoria	8.5 km (5.3 mi)	130 km (81 mi) east of Melbourne	●	●	●	●							
Atherton Tablelands Rail Trail	Queensland	20.5 km (12.7 mi)	88 km (55 mi) southwest of Cairns	●	●	●	●							
Birregurra - Forrest 'Tiger' Rail Trail	Victoria	7 km (4.3 mi)	136 km (85 mi) southwest of Melbourne	●	●	●	●							
Boolboonda Railtrail and Tunnel	Queensland	3 km (1.9 mi)	90 km (56 mi) west of Bundaberg	●	●		●					●		
Box Vale Tramway Trail	New South Wales	4.5 km (2.8 mi)	3 km (1.9 mi) northwest of Mittagong	●	●									
Buderim Tramway Heritage Trail	Queensland	2 km (1.2 mi)	100 km (62 mi) north of Brisbane	●	●									
Caboolture - Wamuran and Loop Rail Trail	Queensland	6 km (3.7 mi)	58 km (36 mi) north of Brisbane	●	●									
Canungra Tramway Tunnel	Queensland	1 km (0.62 mi)	80 km (50 mi) south of Brisbane	●	●									
Capricorn Coast Pineapple Rail Trail	Queensland	4.5 km (2.8 mi)	633 km (393 mi) north of Brisbane	●	●	●	●		●	●	●			
Carnarvon Tramway	Western Australia	3 km (1.9 mi)	904 km (562 mi) north of Perth	●	●		●							
Castlemaine to Maldon Trail	Victoria	18 km (11 mi)	120 km (75 mi) northwest of Melbourne		●									
Collie-Darkan Rail Trail	Western Australia	47 km (29 mi)	202 km (126 mi) south of Perth	●	●		●							
Como Bridge	New South Wales	1.5 km (0.93 mi)	20 km (12 mi) south of Sydney	●	●		●		●	●	●			
Darwin Rail Trail	Northern Territory	25.5 km (15.8 mi)	0 km (0 mi) from Darwin	●	●		●		●	●	●			
Denmark to Nornalup Rail Trail	Western Australia	54.5 km (33.9 mi)	415 km (258 mi) south of Perth	●	●	●								
Don to Devonport Cycleway	Tasmania	7.5 km (4.7 mi)	0 km (0 mi) from Devonport	●	●		●		●	●	●			
Dookie Rail Trail	Victoria	5 km (3.1 mi)	220 km (140 mi) northeast of Melbourne	●	●		●		●	●	●			
Dubbo Tracker Riley Cyclepath extension	New South Wales	12.5 km (7.8 mi)	1 km (0.62 mi) south of Dubbo	●	●		●		●	●				
Duck Hole Lake Trail	Tasmania	1.8 km (1.1 mi)	102 km (63 mi) south of Hobart	●										
Dularcha National Park Rail Trail	Queensland	3.2 km (2.0 mi)	77 km (48 mi) north of Brisbane	●	●									
Farming Heritage Trail	Western Australia	18 km (11 mi)	59 km (37 mi) east of Perth	●	●	●								
Fassifern Rail Trail	Queensland	6 km (3.7 mi)	80 km (50 mi) southwest of Brisbane	●	●	●	●							
Fassifern to Toronto Rail Trail	New South Wales	4 km (2.5 mi)	160 km (99 mi) north of Sydney	●	●		●		●	●	●			
Ferny Grove Rail Trail	Queensland	5 km (3.1 mi)	16 km (9.9 mi) northwest of Brisbane	●	●	●	●		●	●				
Glendale to Wallsend Cycleway	New South Wales	8.5 km (5.3 mi)	8 km (5.0 mi) west of Newcastle	●	●		●							
Gloucester Tree to Cascades Tramway Walk	Western Australia	6 km (3.7 mi)	340 km (210 mi) from Perth	●										
Grampians Rail Trail	Victoria	11 km (6.8 mi)	233 km (145 mi) northwest of Melbourne	●	●		●							
Great Divide Rail Trail	Victoria	4.5 km (2.8 mi)	110 km (68 mi) northwest of Melbourne	●	●									
Hawthorn to Kew Rail Trail	Victoria	1 km (0.62 mi)	5 km (3.1 mi) east of Melbourne	●	●		●		●	●	●			
Hobart Intercity Cycleway	Tasmania	15.6 km (9.7 mi)	1 km (0.62 mi) from Hobart	●	●		●		●	●	●			
Hopetoun - Ravensthorpe Railway Heritage Walk	Western Australia	39 km (24 mi)	588 km (365 mi) southeast of Perth	●										
Irvinebank to Boonmoo Rail Trail	Queensland	17.5 km (10.9 mi)	140 km (87 mi) southwest of Cairns	●	●									
Jarrahdale 1872 Timber Tramway	Western Australia	8 km (5.0 mi)	50 km (31 mi) southeast of Perth	●										
Jarrahdale Balmoral Trail	Western Australia	12 km (7.5 mi)	50 km (31 mi) southeast of Perth	●	●									
Kalamunda Railway Heritage Trail	Western Australia	11 km (6.8 mi)	25 km (16 mi) southeast of Perth	●	●									
Kalamunda Zig Zag Trail	Western Australia	3 km (1.9 mi)	25 km (16 mi) east of Perth	●	●		●					●		
Katherine Rail Trail	Northern Territory	6 km (3.7 mi)	0 km (0 mi) from Katherine	●	●		●		●	●	●			
Kilkivan - Kingaroy Rail Trail	Queensland	89 km (55 mi)	225 km (140 mi) northwest of Brisbane	●	●	●	●						●	
Lake Margaret Tramway Trail	Tasmania	3.5 km (2.2 mi)	15 km (9.3 mi) north of Queenstown	●										
Lapstone Viaduct and Zig Zag	New South Wales	1.5 km (0.93 mi)	60 km (37 mi) west of Sydney	●										
Liffey Falls Rail Trail	Tasmania	5 km (3.1 mi)	25 km (16 mi) south of Deloraine	●										
Meadowbank Railway Bridge	New South Wales	0.5 km (0.31 mi)	12 km (7.5 mi) west of Sydney	●	●		●		●	●	●			
Melba Flats to Zeehan Rail Trail	Tasmania	9 km (5.6 mi)	30 km (19 mi) northwest of Queenstown	●	●									
Mike Turtur Bikeway	South Australia	9 km (5.6 mi)	0 km (0 mi) from Adelaide	●	●		●		●	●	●			
Montezuma Falls Rail Trail	Tasmania	19.5 km (12.1 mi)	30 km (19 mi) northwest of Queenstown	●	●							●		
Mount Gambier Rail Trail	South Australia	5.4 km (3.4 mi)	0 km (0 mi) from Mount Gambier	●	●		●		●	●	●			
Mt Garnet to Lappa Junction Rail Trail	Queensland	55 km (34 mi)	190 km (120 mi) southwest of Cairns	●	●			●						
Munda Biddi Trail	Western Australia	1,060 km (660 mi)	20 km (12 mi) west of Perth	●	●									
Mundaring Weir Rail Trail	Western Australia	7 km (4.3 mi)	25 km (16 mi) east of Perth	●	●		●							
Muntapa Tunnel	Queensland	0.6 km (0.37 mi)	15 km (9.3 mi) south of Cooyar	●										
Murchison to Rushworth Rail Trail	Victoria	10 km (6.2 mi)	130 km (81 mi) north of Melbourne	●	●		●							
Mystery Creek Cave Trail	Tasmania	2 km (1.2 mi)	109 km (68 mi) south of Hobart	●										
Nieka Pipeline Track	Tasmania	6 km (3.7 mi)	12 km (7.5 mi) south of Glenorchy	●	●									
Noojee Trestle Bridge Rail Trail	Victoria	3 km (1.9 mi)	100 km (62 mi) east of Melbourne	●	●	●	●		●	●				
North East Tasmania Rail Trail	Tasmania	26 km (16 mi)	62 km (39 mi) km northeast of Launceston	●	●		●							
North Mount Lyell Rail Trail	Tasmania	12 km (7.5 mi)	30 km (19 mi) south of Queenstown	●			●	●						
Northern Rivers Rail Trail	New South Wales	131 km (81 mi) - when completed	Northern Rivers											
Old Timberline Trail	Western Australia	22 km (14 mi)	300 km (190 mi) south of Perth	●	●									
Powelltown Tramway	Victoria	0 km (0 mi)	80 km (50 mi) east of Melbourne	●										
Railton to Sheffield Rail Trail	Tasmania	12 km (7.5 mi)	55 km (34 mi) west of Launceston	●	●		●							
Rocherlea Rail Trail	Tasmania	4 km (2.5 mi)	0 km (0 mi) from Launceston	●	●					●				
Rokeby to Crossover Rail Trail	Victoria	5 km (3.1 mi)	103 km (64 mi) north of Melbourne	●	●	●	●							
Sidings Rail Trail	Western Australia	26 km (16 mi)	300 km (190 mi) south of Perth	●	●									
South Coast Rail Trail and Ernest Junction Tunnel	Queensland	0.75 km (0.47 mi)	60 km (37 mi) southeast of Brisbane	●										
Southern Flinders Rail Trail	South Australia	34.5 km (21.4 mi)	0 km (0 mi) from Flinders Ranges	●	●	●	●							
Spray Tunnel and Comstock Tramways	Tasmania	6 km (3.7 mi)	1 km (0.62 mi) southwest of Zeehan	●	●							●		
Strahan to Regatta Point Rail Trail	Tasmania	3 km (1.9 mi)	0 km (0 mi) from Strahan	●	●		●		●	●	●	●		
Ten Mile Brook Trail	Western Australia	7.5 km (4.7 mi)	280 km (170 mi) south of Perth	●	●									
The Riesling and Rattler Trail	South Australia	54 km (34 mi)	130 km (81 mi) north of Adelaide	●	●		●		●	●				
The Bunny Rail Trail	Victoria	0.75 km (0.47 mi)	110 km (68 mi) west of Melbourne	●	●		●			●				
The Domino Rail Trail	Victoria	6 km (3.7 mi)	85 km (53 mi) northwest of Melbourne	●	●	●								
The Pioneer Rail Trail	New South Wales	6 km (3.7 mi)	191 km (119 mi) west of Sydney	●	●	●	●		●	●	●			
Torbay to Elleker Rail Trail	Western Australia	8 km (5.0 mi)	25 km (16 mi) west of Albany	●	●	●								
Tumbarumba to Rosewood	New South Wales	21 km (13 mi)	470 km (290 mi) south of Sydney	●	●		●		●	●	●			
Wadandi Track	Western Australia	23 km (14 mi)	280 km (170 mi) southwest of Perth	●	●									
Watawa Recreation Rail Trail	Queensland	3.4 km (2.1 mi)	50 km (31 mi) west of Bundaberg	●	●	●	●							
Webb Dock Bridge	Victoria	0.5 km (0.31 mi)	1 km (0.62 mi) from Melbourne	●	●		●		●	●	●			
Wee Georgie Wood and the Tullah Tramway Trail	Tasmania	1.5 km (0.93 mi)	40 km (25 mi) north of Queenstown	●										
Wielangta Tramway Trail	Tasmania	6.5 km (4.0 mi)	75 km (47 mi) east of Hobart	●	●									
Winterbrook Falls Rail Trail	Tasmania	6 km (3.7 mi)	30 km (19 mi) southwest of Devonport	●										
Wulkuraka - Brassall Rail Trail	Queensland	3 km (1.9 mi)	41 km (25 mi) west of Brisbane	●	●		●		●	●				
