= North Burnett Region =

Coordinates: 25°37′30″S 151°36′20″E

- Local government area
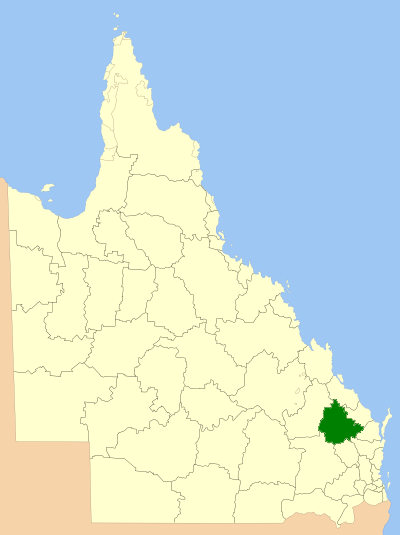
- Location in Queensland

- Interactive map of North Burnett Region
- Country: Australia
- State: Queensland
- Region: Wide Bay–Burnett
- Established: 2008
- Council seat: Gayndah

Government
  - Mayor: Les Hotz
  - State electorate: Callide
  - Federal division: Flynn, Hinkler

Area
  - Total: 19,670 km^{2} (7,590 sq mi)

Population
  - Total: 10,068 (2021 census)
  - Density: 0.51185/km^{2} (1.3257/sq mi)
LGAs around North Burnett Region
Banana	Gladstone	Gladstone
Banana	North Burnett Region	Bundaberg
Western Downs	South Burnett	Gympie, Fraser Coast

The North Burnett Region is a local government area in Queensland, Australia in the northern catchment of the Burnett River. Established in 2008, it was preceded by several previous local government areas with histories extending back to the early 1900s.

It has an estimated operating budget of A$32 million.

In the 2021 census, the North Burnett Region had a population of 10,068 people.

== History ==
Prior to the 2008 amalgamation, the North Burnett Region, located in the northern catchment of the Burnett River, existed as six distinct local government areas:

- the Shire of Biggenden;
- the Shire of Eidsvold;
- the Shire of Gayndah;
- the Shire of Monto;
- the Shire of Mundubbera;
- and the Shire of Perry.

The first local government in the North Burnett area was the Gayndah Municipality, which was created on 28 November 1866 under the Municipal Corporations Act 1864. On 11 November 1879, the Rawbelle and Perry Divisions were created to serve regional areas under the Divisional Boards Act 1879. A third division, Eidsvold, was proclaimed on 25 January 1890.

On 31 March 1903, following the enactment of the Local Authorities Act 1902, Gayndah became a town while the three divisions became shires. On 3 June 1905, the Shire of Degilbo, centred on Biggenden, was established from part of the Shire of Burrum. On 19 May 1915, the Shire of Auburn (later renamed Mundubbera) was separately incorporated. On 17 March 1923, the Shire of Rawbelle was renamed Gayndah and on 24 May 1924, it absorbed the Town. On 3 March 1932, the Shire of Monto came into being and Eidsvold was reincorporated. Finally, on 12 July 1941, Degilbo was renamed Biggenden.

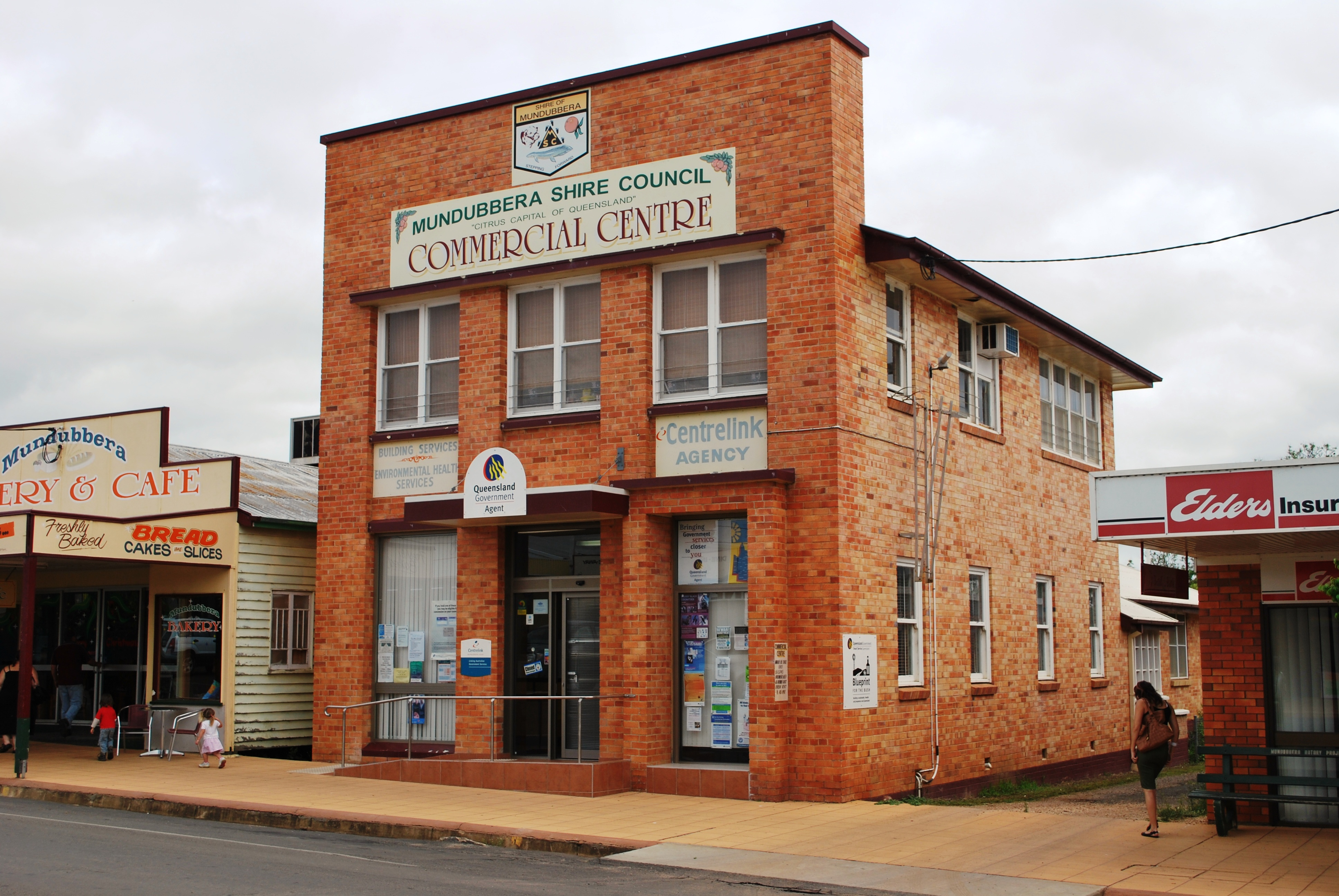
Council service centre, 2008

In July 2007, the Local Government Reform Commission released its report and recommended that the six areas amalgamate, asserting that there were "inefficiencies with having six local governments to manage the economic and community interests of a relatively small geographic region which has a static population of just over 10,000". It believed amalgamation would offer potential for both strategic planning and improving the quality of governance and decision-making, as well as allowing one of the towns to emerge as a regional centre for the area. Queensland Treasury had rated all of the councils for financial sustainability, with all except Perry and Biggenden attracting a weak rating. Each of the councils apart from Gayndah opposed the Commission's model, with several suggesting either amalgamation with one or two other shires, or with local governments outside the region (in particular the Shire of Kolan and Gladstone/Calliope). In the end, its proposal was unchanged. On 15 March 2008, the Shires formally ceased to exist, and elections were held on the same day to elect councillors and a mayor to the Regional Council.

== Wards and councillors ==
The Region is divided into six divisions, each electing one councillor, with a mayor elected by the entire Region. Joy Jensen, the mayor for the Shire of Perry, was elected at the March 2008 local government elections but was not re-elected in 2012.

== Mayors ==
- 2008–2012: Joy Jensen
- 2012–2016: Don Waugh
- 2016–2021: Rachel Louise Chambers
- 2022-Current: Les Hotz

== Towns and localities ==
The North Burnett Region includes the following settlements:

Biggenden area:

- Biggenden
- Coalstoun Lakes
- Dallarnil
- Degilbo
- Didcot

Eidsvold area:

- Abercorn
- Ceratodus
- Eidsvold
- Wuruma Dam

Gayndah area:

- Ban Ban Springs
- Binjour
- Byrnestown
- Gayndah
- Gooroolba
- Ideraway
- Wetheron

Monto area:

- Bancroft
- Bukali
- Cannia
- Cannindah
- Coominglah
- Coominglah Forest
- Glenleigh
- Harrami
- Kalpowar
- Kapaldo
- Langley
- Monal
- Monto
- Moonford
- Mulgildie
- Mungungo
- Rawbelle
- Selene
- Splinter Creek
- Tellebang
- Three Moon
- Ventnor

Mundubbera area:

- Boynewood
- Dykehead
- Gurgeena
- Monogorilby
- Mundubbera
- Philpott
- Riverleigh

Perry area:

- Mount Perry

Other areas:

- Aranbanga
- Ban Ban
- Barlyne
- Beeron
- Blairmore
- Bon Accord
- Branch Creek
- Brovinia
- Campbell Creek
- Cattle Creek
- Cheltham
- Coonambula
- Coringa
- Cynthia
- Deep Creek
- Derri Derra
- Dirnbir
- Dundarrah
- Eidsvold East
- Eidsvold West
- Ginoondan
- Glenrae
- Golden Fleece
- Good Night
- Grosvenor
- Harriet
- Hawkwood
- Humphery
- Lakeside
- Malmoe
- Mingo, Queensland
- Mount Debateable
- Mount Lawless
- Mount Steadman
- Mundowran
- Mungy
- O'Bil Bil
- Old Cooranga
- Penwhaupell
- Pile Gully
- Reids Creek
- Stockhaven
- The Limits
- Toondahra
- Wahoon
- Wateranga
- Wilson Valley
- Woodmillar
- Woowoonga
- Yarrol
- Yenda

== Libraries ==
The North Burnett Regional Council operates public libraries at Biggenden, Eidsvold, Gayndah, Monto, Mount Perry, and Mundubbera.

== Planning scheme ==
The North Burnett Regional Council's first planning scheme commenced on 3 November 2014. It replaced the six planning schemes prepared by the former Councils. As a scheme that follows the State-mandated structure it contains the following key components: a Strategic framework (Part 3), Priority infrastructure plan (Part 4), Tables of assessment (Part 5), Zones (Part 6), Overlays (Part 8), Other codes (Part 9), Definitions (Schedule 1), Mapping (Schedules 2 and 3) and Planning scheme policies (Schedule 6).

Planning scheme mapping is accessible via the Council's online interactive mapping.

== Heritage ==
On 5 May 2014, the North Burnett Regional Council published their first Local Heritage Register, containing 64 sites out of a proposed 71.

== Demographics ==
Year	Total Region	Biggenden	Eidsvold	Gayndah	Monto	Mundubbera	Perry
1933	14,322	2,476	1,475	3,760	3,514	2,302	795
1947	13,861	2,179	1,313	3,407	4,270	2,064	628
1954	13,917	1,974	1,311	3,352	4,458	2,326	496
1961	13,993	1,882	1,242	3,400	4,397	2,617	455
1966	13,715	1,722	1,702	3,182	4,155	2,580	374
1971	12,230	1,639	1,222	3,107	3,495	2,391	376
1976	11,504	1,532	1,231	2,814	3,228	2,395	304
1981	11,565	1,411	1,256	2,859	3,249	2,481	309
1986	11,583	1,553	1,212	2,887	3,266	2,355	310
1991	11,230	1,574	1,028	2,856	3,058	2,340	374
1996	11,243	1,570	970	2,916	2,922	2,514	351
2001	10,782	1,486	933	2,894	2,592	2,451	426
2006	10,551	1,506	876	2,911	2,577	2,236	445
2016	10,478						
2021	10,068						
