= Australian Engineering Heritage Register =

The Australian Engineering Heritage Register marker at Cape Naturaliste Lighthouse.

The Australian Engineering Heritage Register is a heritage register maintained by Engineers Australia as part of its Engineering Heritage Recognition Program to recognise and preserve Australia's engineering and industrial heritage by recording the history of significant engineering works and by placing markers and interpretative panels at heritage sites. The register has no legislative standing.

The register was first established in 1984 and, by the end of 2016, had recognised 212 engineering heritage works.

== See also ==
- List of recipients of Engineers Australia engineering heritage markers
- List of engineering awards
