= Gayndah =

- Town
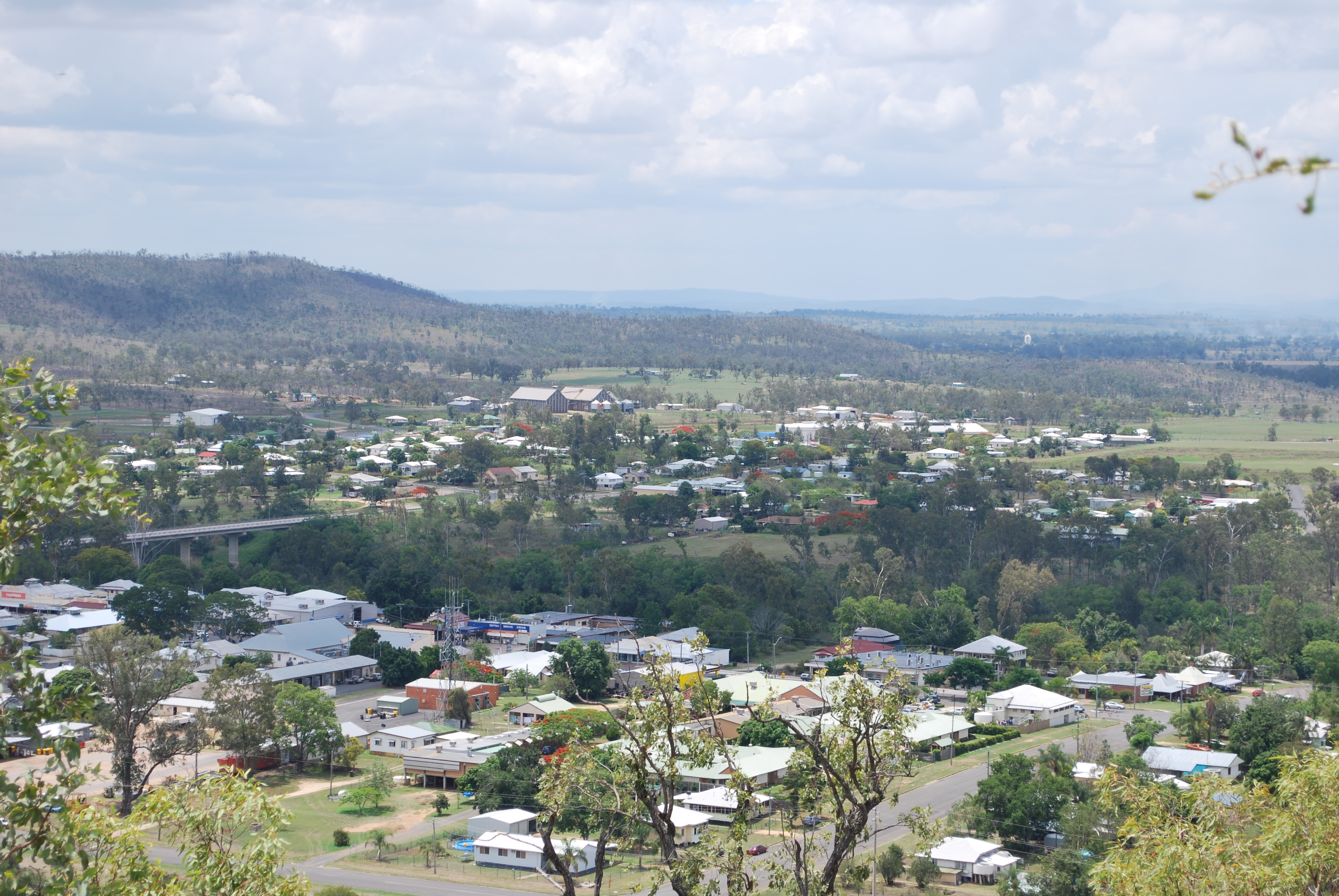
- Gayndah, seen from the town lookout

- Interactive map of Gayndah
- Coordinates: 25.6244°S 151.6080°E
- Country: Australia
- State: Queensland
- LGA: North Burnett Region
- Location: 147 km (91 mi) SW of Bundaberg; 149 km (93 mi) W of Maryborough; 157 km (98 mi) WNW of Gympie; 326 km (203 mi) NW of Brisbane
- Established: 1849

Government
  - State electorate: Callide
  - Federal division: Flynn

Area
  - Total: 68.1 km^{2} (26.3 sq mi)
- Elevation: 106 m (348 ft)

Population
  - Total: 1,949 (2021 census)
  - Density: 28.620/km^{2} (74.12/sq mi)
- Time zone: UTC+10:00 (AEST)
- Postcode: 4625
- Mean max temp: 28.2 °C (82.8 °F)
- Mean min temp: 13.6 °C (56.5 °F)
- Annual rainfall: 766.9 mm (30.19 in)
Localities around Gayndah
Dirnbir	Ideraway; Bon Accord	Wetheron
Mount Debateable	Gayndah	Ginoondan
Woodmillar	The Limits	Campbell Creek

Gayndah (/ɡeɪndə/) is a town and locality in the North Burnett Region, Queensland, Australia. It is the administrative centre for the North Burnett Region. In the 2021 census, the locality of Gayndah had a population of 1,949 people.

== Geography ==
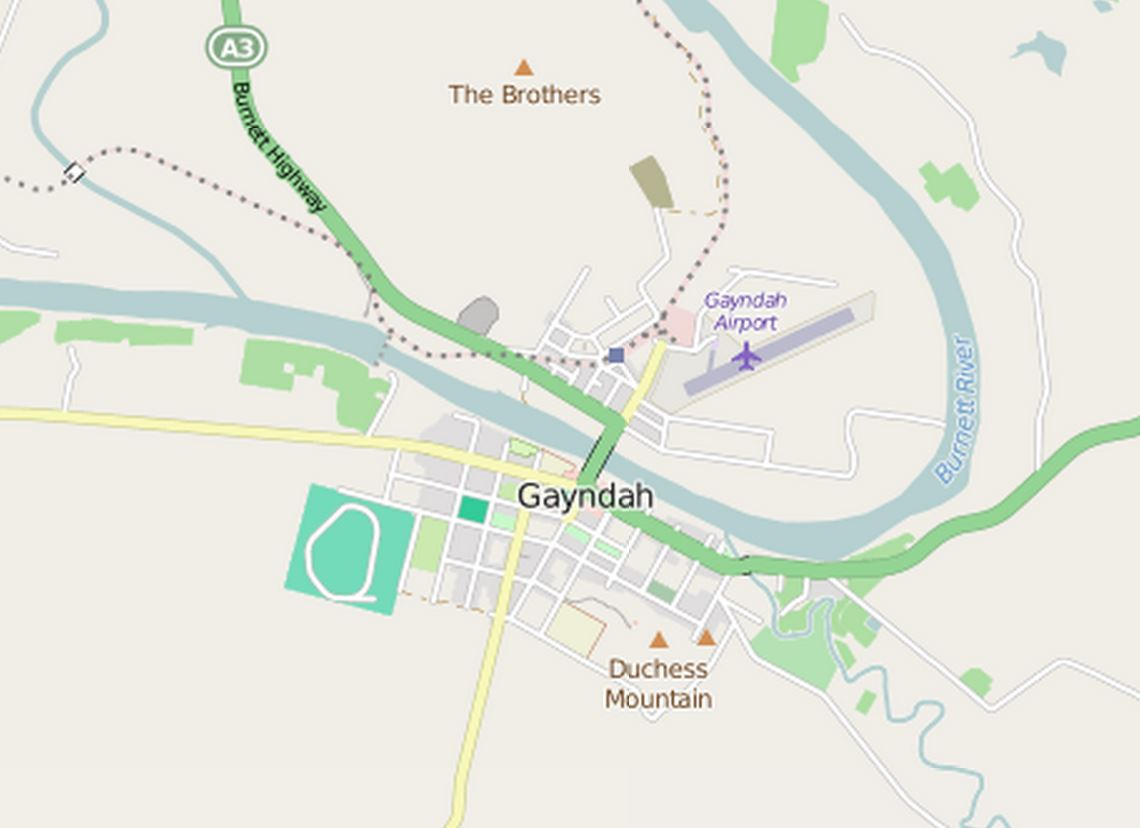
Map of the town of Gayndah, 2015

Gayndah is on the Burnett River and the Burnett Highway passes through the town. Apart from the town in the western part of the locality, the land is used for cropping and grazing. The Mungar Junction to Monto Branch railway line once passed through the town, but it has since been closed and now lies abandoned.

Duchess Mountain is immediately to the south-west of the town (25°38′00″S 151°36′47″E) and at 190 metres (620 ft) provides excellent views over the town (100 metres (330 ft) above sea level).

Gayndah is 366 kilometres (227 mi) north of the state capital, Brisbane, and 145 kilometres (90 mi) west of the regional city of Maryborough.

Agriculture and grazing have been the dominant industries of the area. The town is the centre of Queensland's largest citrus-growing area.

== History ==
The name Gayndah is of Aboriginal origin but the derivative is unclear. It may derive either from Gu-in-dah (or Gi-un-dah), meaning thunder, or from Ngainta meaning place of scrub. Alternatively it may be derived from Waka language kunda meaning range or ridge, or ga-een-ta meaning bushy land. Wakka Wakka (Waka Waka, Wocca Wocca, Wakawaka) is an Australian Aboriginal language spoken in the Burnett River catchment. The Wakka Wakka language region includes the landscape within the local government boundaries of the North and South Burnett Regional Council, particularly the towns of Gayndah, Cherbourg, Murgon, Kingaroy, Eidsvold and Mundubbera.

The well-known "Wetheron" property, 12 miles from Gayndah, was taken up by William Humphrey in 1845, and from him it passed to the Hons. Berkeley Basil and Seymour Moreton, sons of the Earl of Ducie. When the foundations of Gayndah were being laid there were only a few squatters on the Burnett River, and these were nearly all educated men of good families with command of money and the confidence of the banks and financial institutions.

Exploration of the Gayndah area began in 1847 by explorer Thomas Archer and Surveyor James Charles Burnett (1815–1854). The first European settlers arrived in 1848, and the town was established in the following year. A post office was established at Gayndah in 1850. This suggests that Gayndah may be the oldest officially gazetted town in Queensland, although the Moreton Bay penal colony of 47 people was established at Redcliffe on Moreton Bay in 1824 but relocated in 1825 to a site on the Brisbane River (now Brisbane's central business district).

Brisbane's population by 1856 was only an estimated 3,840. Gayndah and Ipswich were regional towns of similar size and competed with Brisbane to become the capital of Queensland when it became a separate colony from New South Wales in 1859. The main impetus to the growth of Brisbane and the development of a distinctive city centre came through the introduction of self-government, hand-in-hand with immigration and general economic expansion. By 1868 Brisbane was the largest town in Queensland with a population of 15,240.

Gayndah was a centre of early sheep properties in southern Queensland (then NSW) and where many Chinese men travelled via Amoy and then Marybourough to work as shepherds. As early as 1851 it was declared that: "Almost every station in the two districts of Wide Bay and Burnett is supplied with Chinese or Coolie labourers, ..." The same writer also acknowledged that their "wages are so small they have nothing to lay out." However as their indentured where for five years only once free to seek employment at more equitable rates many of these men remained in the area and often applied for naturalisation as British subjects to allow them to take up land. These included men such a Thomas Ashney who among other things was a Guyndah hotelkeeper.

This is a population that was added to by the arrival of people from the more southern Cantonese Pearl River Delta area so that by the late 1860s in a discussion about Police Magistrates in the Queensland Legislative Assembly it was declared that: "There was a large Chinese population settled at Gayndah, and they were bound to protect those people ...".

In 1857, Tom White came to Gayndah and started the newspaper, The Burnett Argus in April 1861.

Gayndah State School opened on 12 October 1863.

In 1870, the first Catholic church opened in Gayndah. In 1912 Father Patrick Brady decided a new church was needed. On 18 April 1915 Archbishop James Duhig blessed and opened the new church before a crowd of 800 people. The new church was built at 46 Meson Street (25.6232°S 151.6061°E) on the south bank of the Burnett River and was 60 by 32 feet (18.3 by 9.8 m) with walls 15 feet (4.6 m) high and constructed of ferro-concrete with asbestos roof tiles. The architects were R. Cook & Sons and it was built by contractor H.G. Millar. The total cost of the building and furnishings was about £1500.

The railway was opened to Gayndah on 16 December 1907. Historian Matt J Fox spoke of Gayndah in 1923: "The Gazette now represents the Press in Gayndah, which is a very prosperous town of nearly a thousand people, the centre of a thriving district of farmers and fruit-growers and squatters, with a rural population of over 4,000 people".

In 1872, the town was the location where the hoax fish Ompax spatuloides was supposedly procured.

Gayndah North State School opened on 14 February 1918. It closed on 24 August 1931.

Gayndah Aboriginal Provisional School opened on 8 August 1918. It became Gayndah Aboriginal State School in 1942. It closed in 1949.

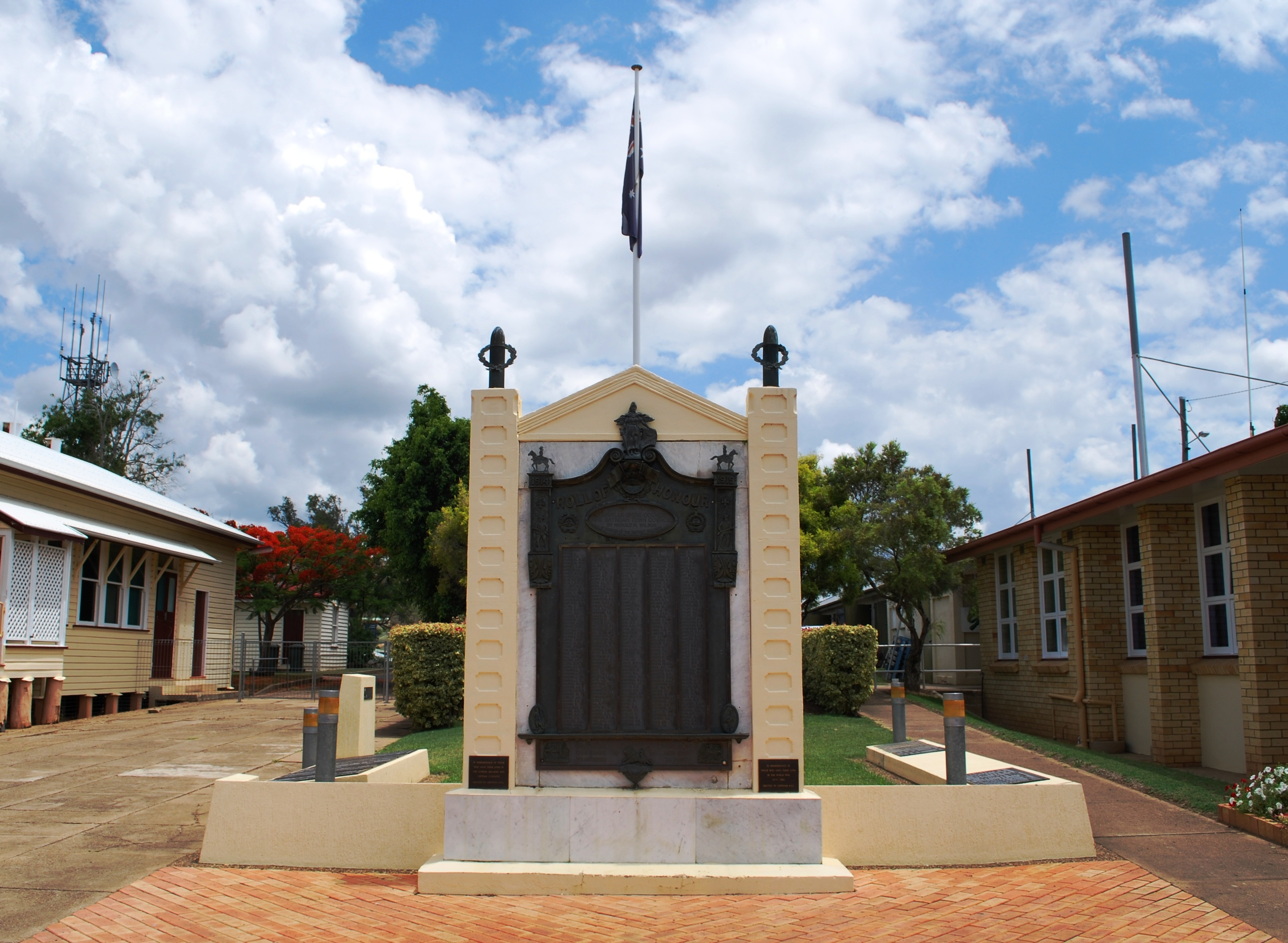
Gayndah War Memorial, 2008

On 8 September 1919 the Gayndah War Memorial was dedicated by the Member of the Queensland Legislative Assembly for Burnett, Bernard Corser.

St Joseph's Catholic School opened on 6 October 1919.

During World War II, Gayndah was the location of RAAF No.8 Inland Aircraft Fuel Depot (IAFD), completed in 1942 and closed on 29 August 1944. Usually consisting of 4 tanks, 31 fuel depots were built across Australia for the storage and supply of aircraft fuel for the RAAF and the US Army Air Forces at a total cost of £900,000 ($1,800,000).

Gayndah State High School opened on 29 January 1963. On 3 March 2006 it became Burnett State College.

The foundation stone of the Gayndah Methodist Church was laid on 28 October 1967 by Reverend Ivan Wells Alcorn. With the amalgamation of the Methodist Church into the Uniting Church in Australia in 1977, it became Gayndah Uniting Church. It is now known as Central Burnett Uniting Church.

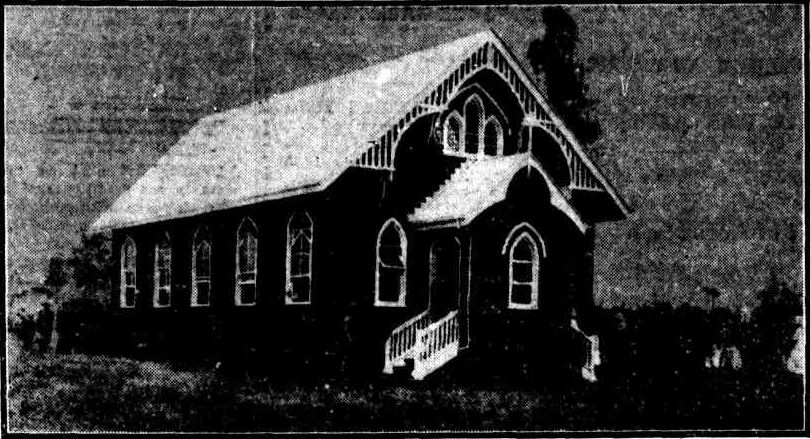
Church of the Sacred Heart at Byrnestown, 1925

In 1969 the Catholic Church of the Sacred Heart at Byrnestown was moved to Gayndah to serve as the church hall for St Joseph's Catholic Church. To reduce the risk of future cyclone damage, the roof was lowered by reducing the height of the walls and reducing the pitch of the roof.

The Mango Tree is a 1977 Australian drama film based on the novel The Mango Tree by Ronald McKie and directed by Kevin Dobson and starring Geraldine Fitzgerald and Sir Robert Helpmann. Filming took place in the town of Gayndah, Mount Perry and Cordalba as well as Bundaberg. The shoot went for seven weeks starting April and ending in June. The streets of Gayndah were closed for filming and a street-scape was created to emulate the 19th century period of the screenplay. Gayndah was chosen because much of its early, country town architecture was intact and reflected the period effectively. Lead actor Christopher Pate is the son of actor Michael Pate who also produced the film.

== Demographics ==
In the 2006 census, the town of Gayndah had a population of 1,745 people.

In the 2011 census, the locality of Gayndah had a population of 1,789 people.

In the 2016 census, the locality of Gayndah had a population of 1,981 people.

In the 2021 census, the locality of Gayndah had a population of 1,949 people.

== Heritage listings ==
Gayndah has a number of heritage-listed sites, including:

- Gayndah Bridge Remnants, off Bridge Street
- Gayndah War Memorial (also known as Rawbelle Shire War Memorial), Capper Street (25.6266°S 151.6102°E)
- Gayndah Court House, 20 Capper Street
- Mellors Drapery and Haberdashery (also known as Overells), 28 Capper Street
- Gayndah Shire Hall (also known as Gayndah Soldiers' Memorial Hall), 32–34 Capper Street
- Gayndah Racecourse, Fisher Avenue
- Gayndah District Hospital Complex, corner of Gordon & Pineapple Streets
- Gayndah State School, 33 Meson Street
- St Joseph's Catholic Convent and Church Grounds, 38 Meson Street
- Gayndah Cemetery, Meyer, Porter & Downing Street
- Gayndah Railway Station Goods Shed and Crane, on National, Elliot and Cordelia Streets
- Brick Cottage (now Gayndah Museum), 8 Simon Street
- Zig Zag Road, Wall Road
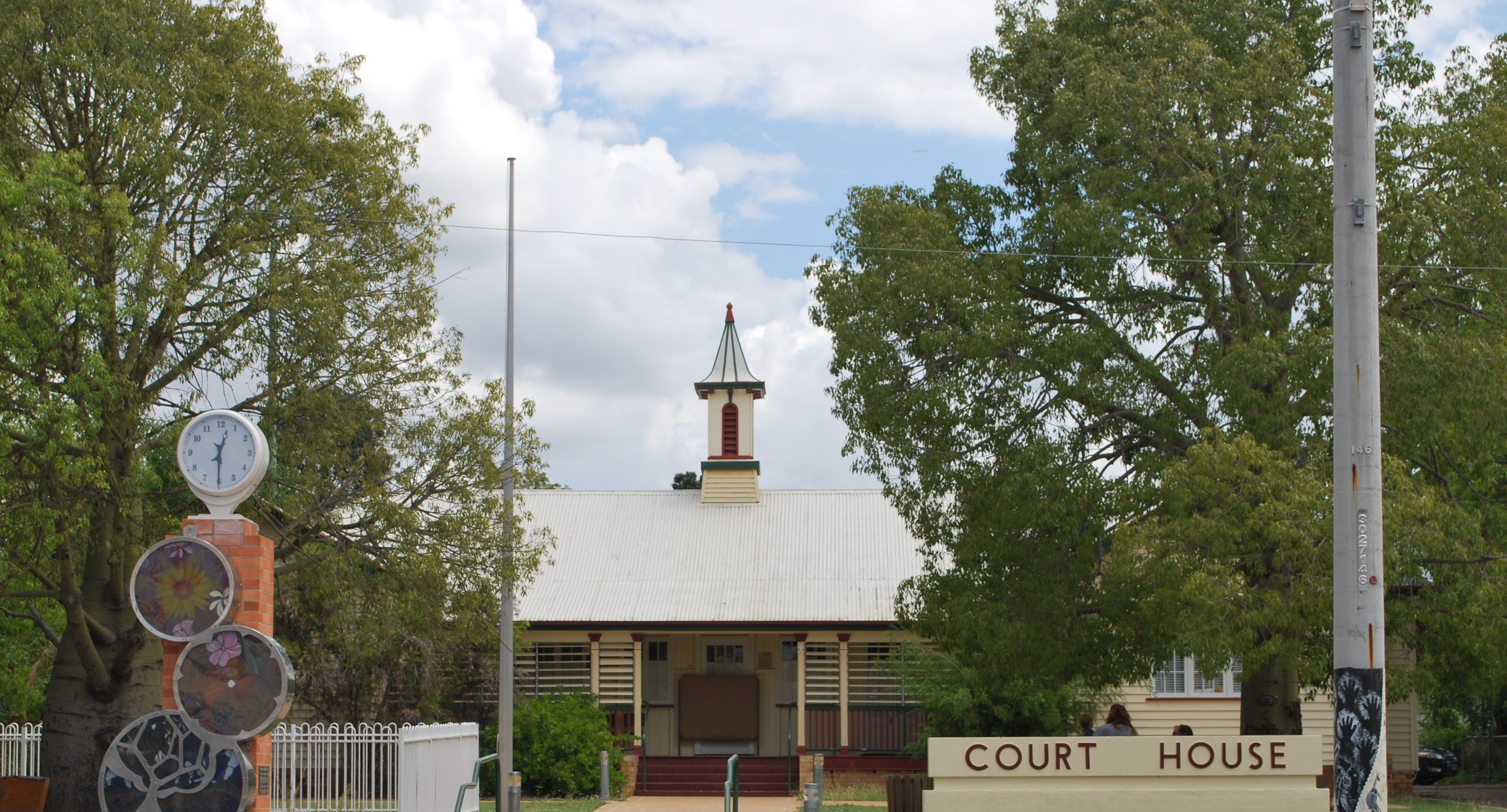
Court house

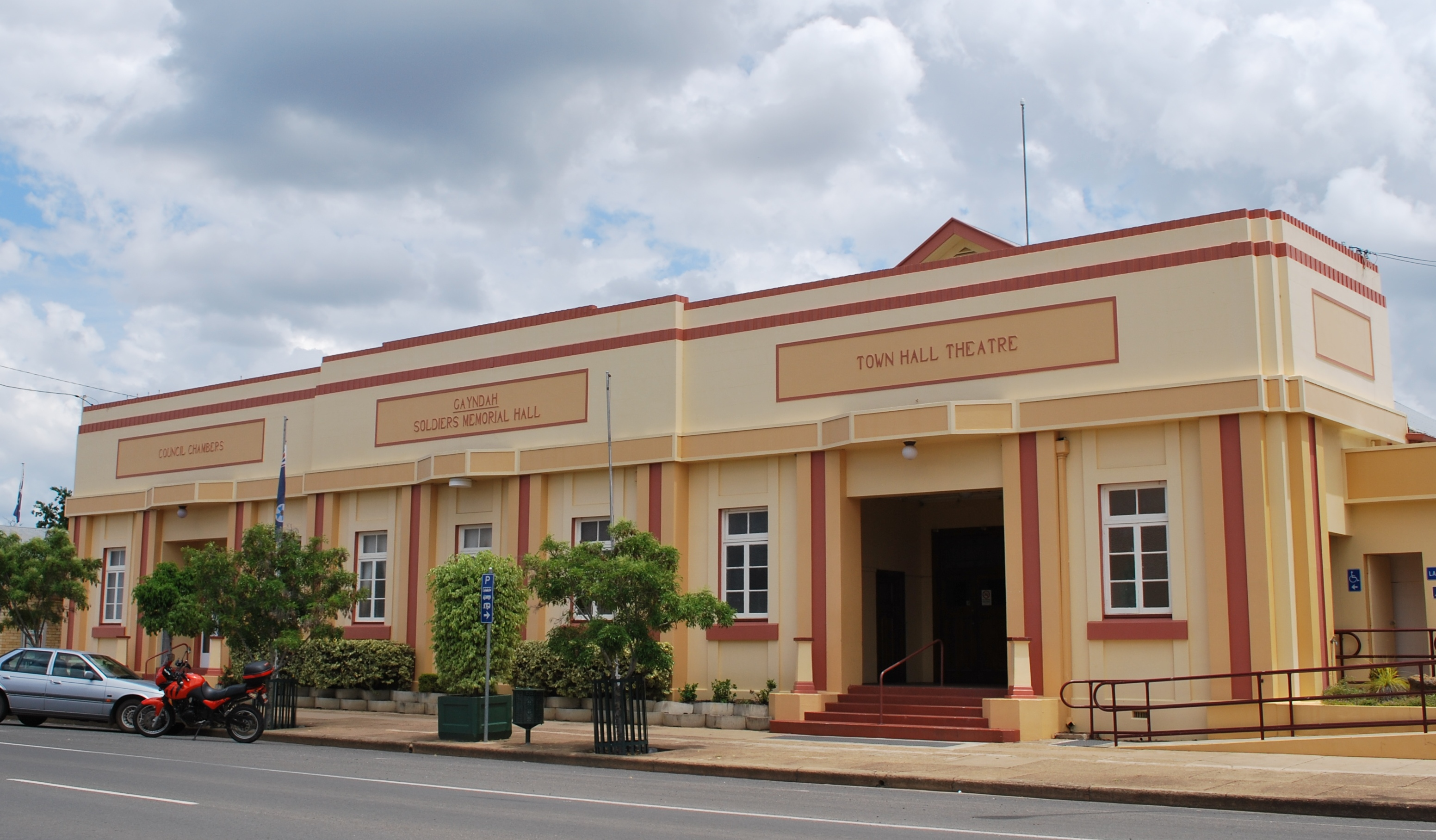
Town hall

== Climate ==
Gayndah experiences a humid subtropical climate (Köppen: Cfa, Trewartha: Cfal), with hot, humid summers and mild, dry, brief winters with cool nights.

Climate data for Gayndah (25º37'48"S, 152º36'36"E, 106 m AMSL) (1879–2012 normals, extremes 1893–2009)
Month	Jan	Feb	Mar	Apr	May	Jun	Jul	Aug	Sep	Oct	Nov	Dec	Year
Record high °C (°F)	44.6 (112.3)	41.7 (107.1)	40.7 (105.3)	39.1 (102.4)	33.3 (91.9)	31.7 (89.1)	30.1 (86.2)	33.9 (93.0)	39.4 (102.9)	41.8 (107.2)	42.8 (109.0)	44.8 (112.6)	44.8 (112.6)
Mean daily maximum °C (°F)	32.8 (91.0)	32.0 (89.6)	30.9 (87.6)	28.6 (83.5)	25.2 (77.4)	22.4 (72.3)	21.9 (71.4)	23.8 (74.8)	26.9 (80.4)	29.6 (85.3)	31.5 (88.7)	32.8 (91.0)	28.2 (82.8)
Mean daily minimum °C (°F)	20.1 (68.2)	19.9 (67.8)	18.1 (64.6)	14.3 (57.7)	10.3 (50.5)	7.5 (45.5)	5.9 (42.6)	6.8 (44.2)	10.2 (50.4)	14.1 (57.4)	17.0 (62.6)	19.1 (66.4)	13.6 (56.5)
Record low °C (°F)	11.7 (53.1)	10.0 (50.0)	6.1 (43.0)	1.1 (34.0)	−1.1 (30.0)	−3.9 (25.0)	−6.0 (21.2)	−4.9 (23.2)	−2.8 (27.0)	1.0 (33.8)	6.0 (42.8)	8.3 (46.9)	−6.0 (21.2)
Average precipitation mm (inches)	112.6 (4.43)	105.7 (4.16)	73.3 (2.89)	37.7 (1.48)	41.2 (1.62)	40.0 (1.57)	38.4 (1.51)	28.8 (1.13)	34.8 (1.37)	65.7 (2.59)	79.9 (3.15)	103.7 (4.08)	760.7 (29.95)
Average precipitation days (≥ 1.0 mm)	5.9	5.6	4.6	3.0	3.0	2.8	2.9	2.4	2.7	4.2	4.9	5.7	47.7
Average afternoon relative humidity (%)	48	51	50	48	48	48	45	40	38	40	41	44	45
Average dew point °C (°F)	18.1 (64.6)	18.5 (65.3)	17.2 (63.0)	14.3 (57.7)	11.4 (52.5)	9.2 (48.6)	7.5 (45.5)	7.3 (45.1)	9.1 (48.4)	12.1 (53.8)	14.5 (58.1)	16.7 (62.1)	13.0 (55.4)
Source: Bureau of Meteorology (1879–2012 normals, extremes 1893–2009)

== Amenities ==
The North Burnett Regional Council operates Gayndah Library on Capper Street. The library offers publicly accessible Wi-Fi.

The former St Joseph's Convent in Meson Street was in 2011 converted into an arts and cultural centre, The Gayndah Arts & Cultural Centre which also houses the Gaynah Art Gallery.

The Gayndah branch of the Queensland Country Women's Association meets at 5 Pineapple Street. The branch was founded in 1923 making it one of the longest operating branches.

Central Burnett Uniting Church (also known as Gayndah Uniting Church) is at 41 Meson Street (25.6239°S 151.6052°E). It is part of the Mary Burnett Presbytery of the Uniting Church in Australia.

Gayndah Wesleyan Methodist Church is at 6 Dalgangal Road (corner of Bridge Street, 25.6198°S 151.6103°E). It is part of the Wesleyan Methodist Church of Australia.

Claude Wharton Weir is owned and managed by Sunwater. North Burnett Regional Council own and manage the boat ramps, facilities and recreation areas. Public access is permitted in designated areas only. Facilities include two boat ramps, picnic shelters, barbecues, public toilets and parking. Camping is prohibited at Claude Wharton Weir. The weir is stocked by the Gayndah Anglers and Fish Stocking Association Inc.

== Education ==
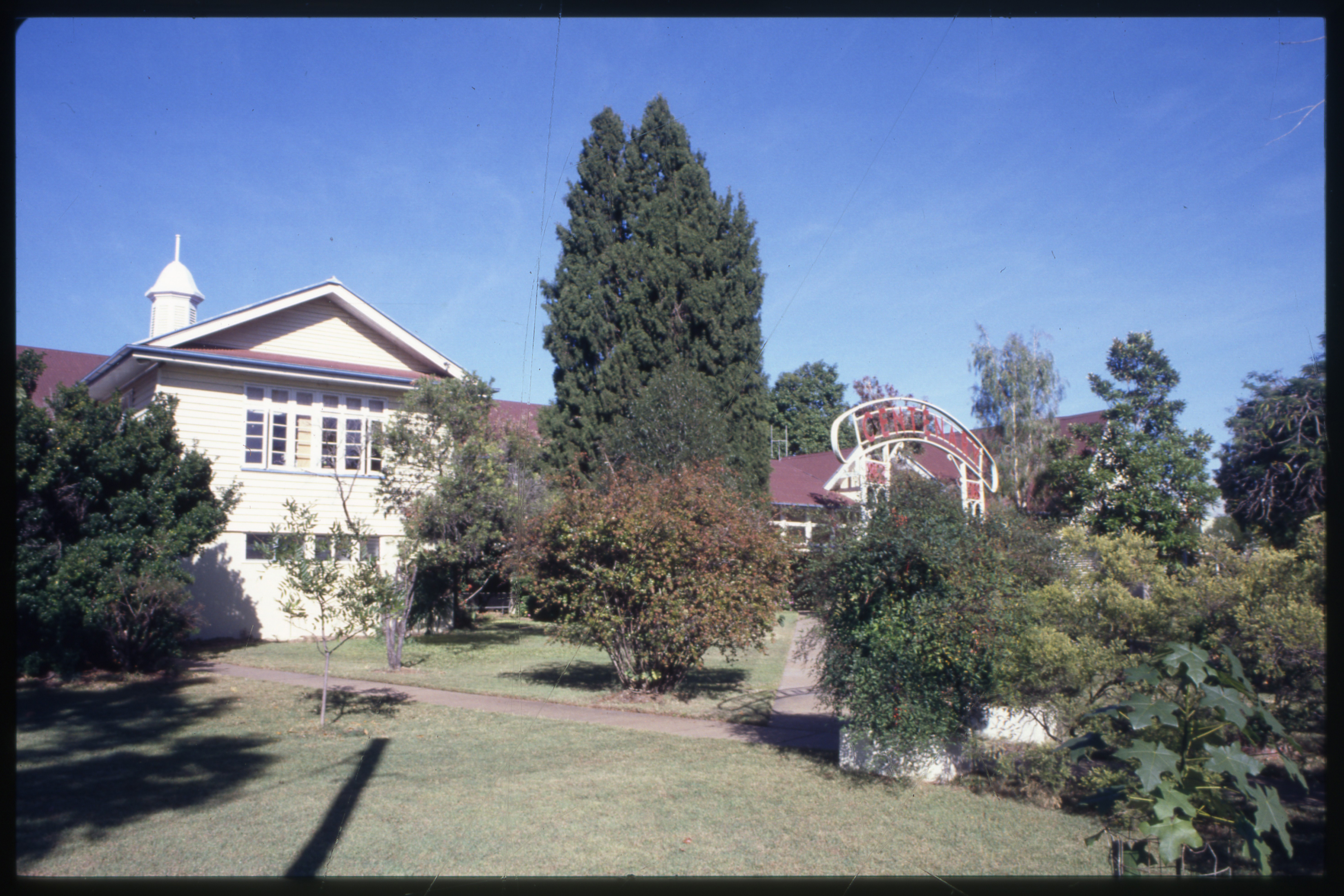
Gayndah State School

Gayndah State School is a government primary (Prep–6) school for boys and girls at 33 Meson Street (25.6238°S 151.6059°E). In 2017, the school had an enrolment of 145 students with 10 teachers (8 full-time equivalent) and 14 non-teaching staff (7 full-time equivalent).

St Joseph's School is a Catholic primary (Prep–6) school for boys and girls at 38 Meson Street (25.6233°S 151.6054°E). In 2017, the school had an enrolment of 86 students with 10 teachers (8 full-time equivalent) and 10 non-teaching staff (5 full-time equivalent).

Burnett State College is a government secondary (7–12) school for boys and girls at 65 Pineapple Street (25.6318°S 151.6063°E). In 2017, the school had an enrolment of 249 students with 26 teachers (25 full-time equivalent) and 22 non-teaching staff (15 full-time equivalent).

== Visitor attractions ==
The town's information centre is located inside a man-made orange, known as The Big Orange.

The Gayndah Orange Festival is held every two years to celebrate this industry.

== Notable residents ==
- Jessica Anderson, who won the Miles Franklin Literary Award in 1978 and 1980, was born in Gayndah.
- Jacob Moerland, the 12th Australian casualty of Operation Slipper, was from Gayndah.
- John Plath, rugby league player, was born in Gayndah.

== Sister city ==
Gayndah has one sister city, signed in 1989, according to Sister Cities Australia Inc. (SCA).

- Zonhoven, Belgium
