= Ban Ban (disambiguation) =

Ban Ban is the stage name of Betty Lai Siu-mana, a semi-retired Hong Kong actress and singer.

Ban Ban may also refer to:

- Ban Ban, Queensland, a rural locality surrounding Ban Ban Springs in Queensland
- Ban Ban Springs, a locality in the Burnett River region of Queensland, Australia
- Ban Ban Springs Station, a cattle station in the Northern Territory
