= Ideraway =

- Town
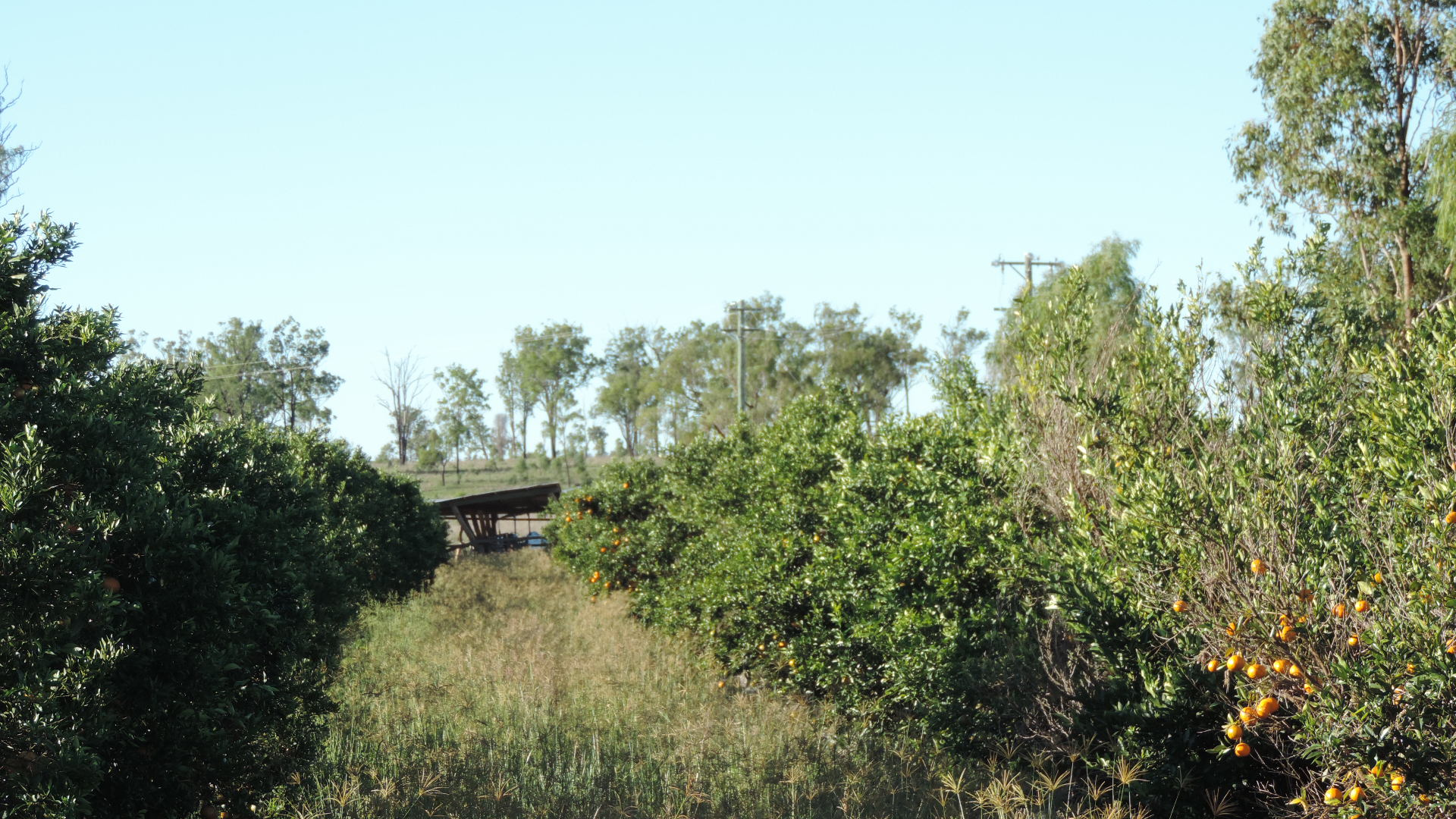
- Citrus orchard, 2014

- Interactive map of Ideraway
- Coordinates: 25.5788°S 151.6183°E
- Country: Australia
- State: Queensland
- LGA: North Burnett Region
- Location: 5.5 km (3.4 mi) NNE of Gayndah; 153 km (95 mi) W of Maryborough; 152 km (94 mi) SW of Bundaberg; 331 km (206 mi) NNW of Brisbane

Government
  - State electorate: Callide
  - Federal division: Flynn

Area
  - Total: 35.5 km^{2} (13.7 sq mi)

Population
  - Total: 31 (2021 census)
  - Density: 0.873/km^{2} (2.26/sq mi)
- Time zone: UTC+10:00 (AEST)
- Postcode: 4625
Localities around Ideraway
| Reids Creek | Yenda | Mount Lawless |
| Reids Creek | Ideraway | Bon Accord |
| Dirnbir | Gayndah | Bon Accord |

Ideraway is a rural town and locality in the North Burnett Region, Queensland, Australia. In the 2021 census, the locality of Ideraway had a population of 31 people.

== Geography ==
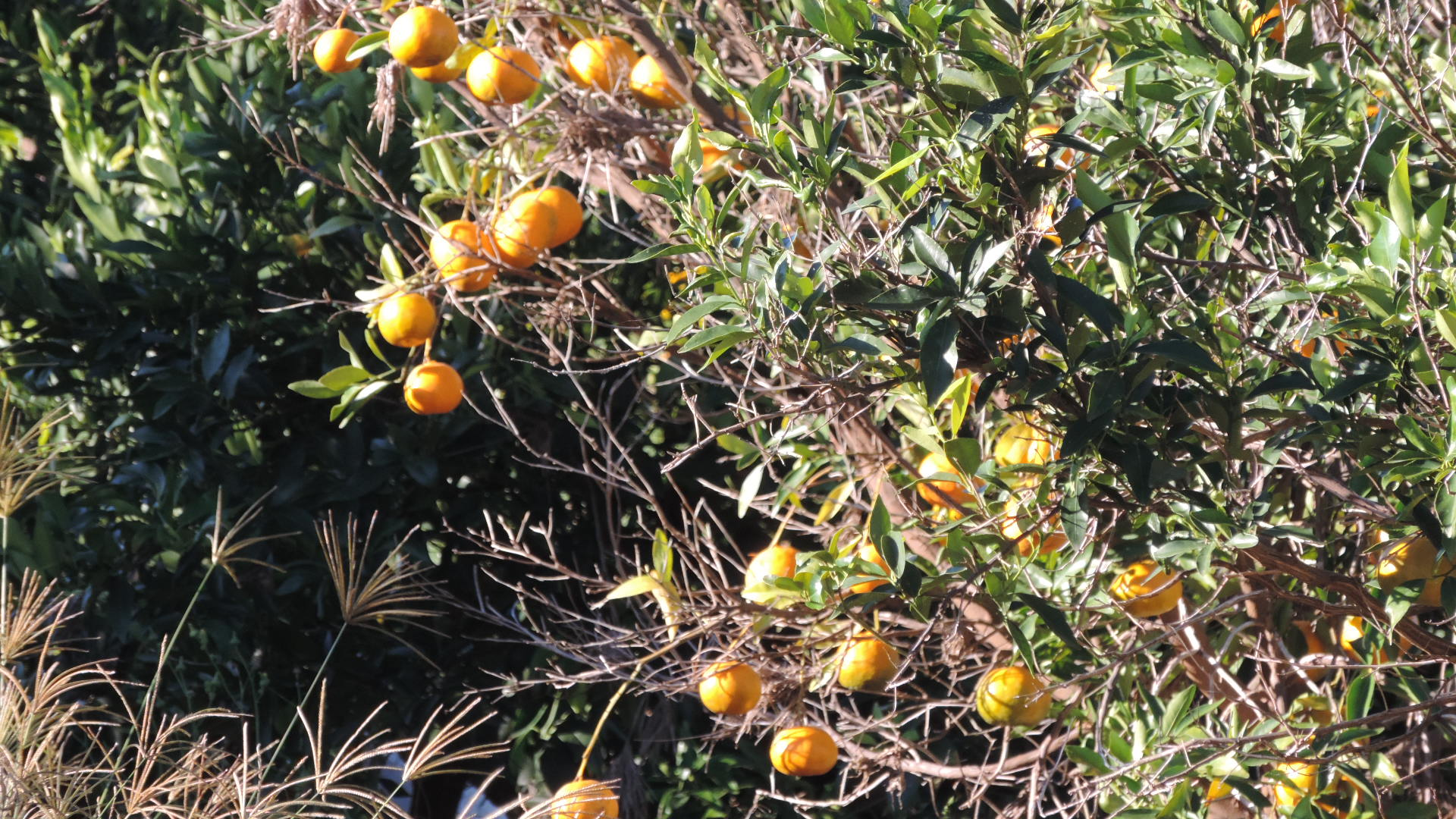
Citrus growing in Ideraway, 2014

The Burnett River forms the south-eastern boundary, while Reid Creek forms the western boundary. The Burnett Highway passes through the south-western corner.

The town is located in the south-east of the locality and most of the housing is within the town. The predominant land use is grazing on native vegetation in the south of the locality with crop growing more in the north of the locality.

== History ==
The town's name was derived from the name of a pastoral run, leased from 1848 by James Blair (or Blain) Reid J.P. Reid acquired the leases of the six stations of sheep country which comprised Ideraway over a period of ten years. The stations were called Tanjour, Binjour, Branch Creek No. 1, Jonday, Penang, and Nour-Nour. In 1869 the leases on Penang and Nour-Nour, at the northern end of the run, were excised from Ideraway and sold as the cattle property of Mungy.

In the 1850s and 1860s the run was the scene of several incidents of colonial frontier conflict. Several children from Ideraway Station with Chinese laborer fathers and First Nation mothers were baptised into the Anglican faith in the early 1870s. The Ideraway Homestead has been relocated to Gayndah Museum's historical precinct.

On 18 December 1905 the Queensland Government legislated An Act to Make Provision for the Purchase of the Ideraway Estate, in the Burnett District, for Settlement under "The Agricultural. Lands Purchase Acts, 1894 to 1901." The land was purchased from Mr James John Cadell. Concurrently, An Act to Provide a Means of Assisting certain Persons to Settle upon the Agricultural Lands of the State was passed. This scheme was different to the earlier failed communal/utopian schemes at nearby Byrnestown, Resolute, and Bon Accord in that land was selected by individuals. The Ideraway Estate scheme was eventually liquidated by the Queensland Agricultural Bank at much loss.

From that time onwards the area became densely infected with the prickly pear . Prior to the release of the cactoblastis cactorum moth in Queensland, arsenic pentoxide was the most effective poison of the plant. P. H. Gerhardt of Ideraway, a prolific inventor, invented the Gerhardt Injector, for injection of the poison. The moth was liberated into the field in 1926, and between then and 1939 butter production in the Gayndah district increased five-fold. Cream from Ideraway was sent to the Maryborough butter factory, and then to the Gayndah butter factory when it opened in 1911, and the district was well-known for its butter production in the 1930s.

The Mungar Junction to Monto railway line opened between Wetheron and Gayndah on 16 December 1907 with the town being served by the Ideraway railway station (25.5770°S 151.6181°E). Increasing competition from road freight resulted in railway services on the line being reduced over the years. In 2015, the Queensland Government decided it no longer wanted to maintain the railway and in 2017 the tracks were removed and the stations abandoned.

Ideraway State School opened in 1909 and closed circa 1952. It was on the south-east corner of Tanjour Street and Bonny Street (25.5792°S 151.6203°E).

Ideraway Post Office opened by December 1909 (a receiving office had been open from 1908) and closed in 1957.

== Demographics ==
In the 2011 census, the combined localities of Ideraway and Yenda had a population of 225 people.

In the 2016 census, the locality of Ideraway had a population of 38 people.

In the 2021 census, the locality of Ideraway had a population of 31 people.

== Heritage listings ==
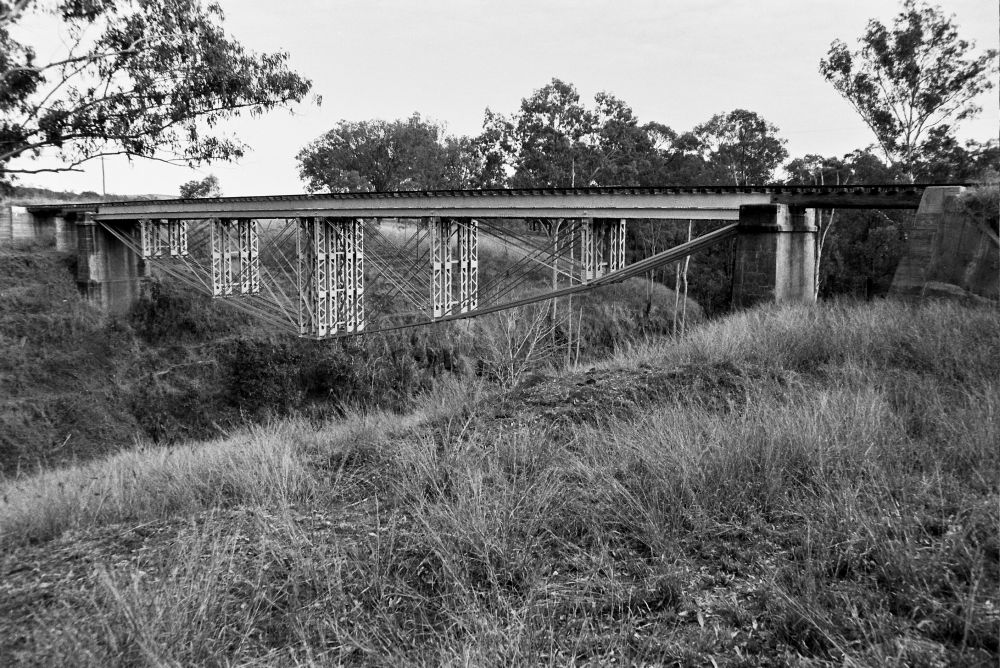
Ideraway Creek Railway Bridge (Ideraway), from North bank

Ideraway Creek has a number of heritage-listed sites, including:

- Mungar-Monto railway line (25.5828°S 151.616°E): Ideraway Creek Railway Bridge (Ideraway Upside Down Bridge)
- Mungar-Monto railway line (25.5932°S 151.6118°E): Steep Rocky Creek Railway Bridge

These bridges were also listed by Engineers Australia in October 2016. The Official Register of Engineering Heritage Markers listed

- Degilbo-Mundubbera Railway Bridges. A total of 12 bridges that are situated on the Mungar Junction to Monto railway line, including these two bridges, are recognized with one Engineering Heritage Marker representing the "best example of a collection of historic railway bridges in Australia".

== Economy ==
There are a number of homesteads in the locality:

- Banapan (25.5772°S 151.6083°E)
- Burnett View (25.5809°S 151.6523°E)
- Dentara (25.5477°S 151.6174°E)
- Ideraway (25.5834°S 151.6329°E)
- Yenda (25.5621°S 151.6212°E)

== Education ==
There are no schools in Ideraway. The nearest government primary school is Gayndah State School in neighbouring Gayndah to the south. The nearest government secondary school is Burnett State College also in Gayndah.
