= Stockhaven, Queensland =

Stockhaven
- Suburb
- Interactive map of Stockhaven
- Coordinates: 25.715°S 151.9538°E
- Country: Australia
- State: Queensland
- LGA: North Burnett Region
- Location: 32.7 km (20.3 mi) SW of Biggenden; 35.9 km (22.3 mi) ENE of Gayndah; 140 km (87 mi) NW of Gympie; 306 km (190 mi) NNW of Brisbane

Government
  - State electorate: Callide
  - Federal division: Flynn

Area
  - Total: 150.8 km^{2} (58.2 sq mi)

Population
  - Total: 0 (2021 census)
  - Density: 0.000/km^{2} (0.000/sq mi)
- Time zone: UTC+10:00 (AEST)
- Postcode: 4625
Suburbs around Stockhaven
| Dundarrah | Biggenden | Boompa |
| Ban Ban | Stockhaven | Boompa |
| Blairmore | Blairmore | Booubyjan |

Stockhaven is a rural locality in the North Burnett Region, Queensland, Australia. In the 2021 census, Stockhaven had "no people or a very low population".

== Geography ==
The Isis Highway is adjacent to a short section of the north-western boundary of the locality.

The north-eastern part of the locality is within the Mount Walsh National Park. Apart from this protected area, the land use is grazing on native vegetation.

== Demographics ==
In the 2016 census, Stockhaven had a population of 5 people.

In the 2021 census, Stockhaven had "no people or a very low population".

== Education ==
There are no schools in Stockhaven. The nearest government primary school is Coalstoun Lakes State School in Coalstoun Lakes to the north-west. The nearest government secondary schools are Biggenden State School (to Year 10) in Biggenden to the north and Burnett State College (to Year 12) in Gayndah to the west.
