= Blairmore =

Blairmore may refer to:

== Australia ==
- Blairmore, Queensland, a locality in the North Burnett Region

== Canada ==
- Blairmore, Alberta, a town in Canada
- Blairmore SDA, Saskatoon, an area in Saskatoon, Saskatchewan

== Scotland ==
- Blairmore, Argyll, a village on the Cowal peninsula, Argyll and Bute
- Blairmore, Sutherland, a rural settlement in Highland
- Blairmore School, a former independent school in Aberdeenshire

== Other uses ==
- Blairmore Holdings, a company
