= Booubyjan, Queensland =

Booubyjan
- Suburb
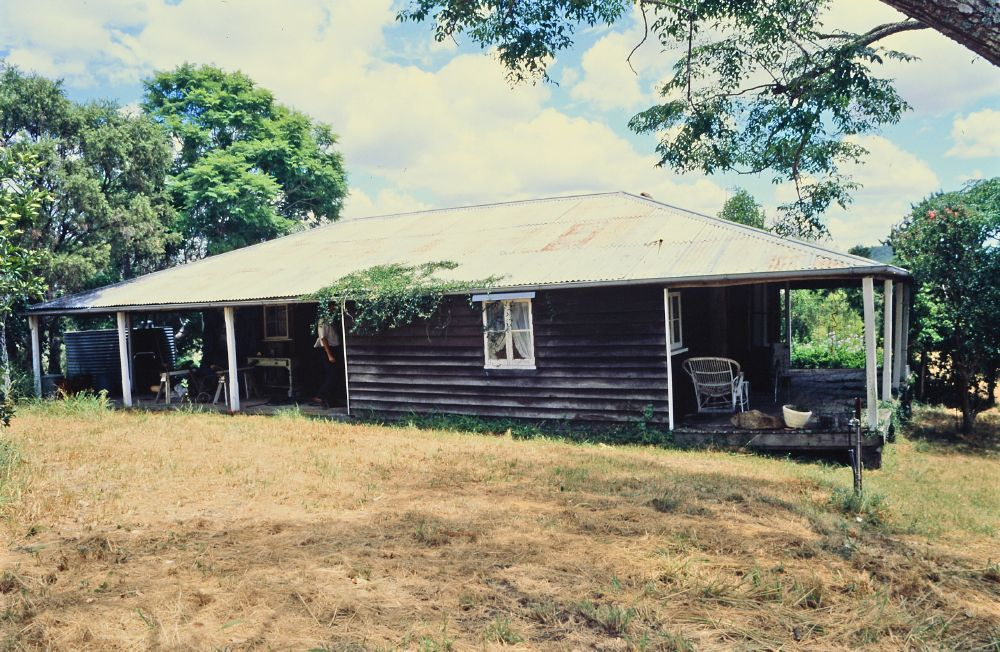
- Cottage at Booubyjan Homestead, 1996

- Interactive map of Booubyjan
- Coordinates: 25.8983°S 151.9205°E
- Country: Australia
- State: Queensland
- LGA: Gympie Region
- Location: 52.5 km (32.6 mi) N of Murgon; 67.0 km (41.6 mi) SE of Gayndah; 90.8 km (56.4 mi) NW of Gympie; 257 km (160 mi) NNW of Brisbane

Government
  - State electorate: Nanango
  - Federal division: Wide Bay

Area
  - Total: 501.5 km^{2} (193.6 sq mi)

Population
  - Total: 98 (2021 census)
  - Density: 0.1954/km^{2} (0.5061/sq mi)
- Time zone: UTC+10:00 (AEST)
- Postcode: 4601
Suburbs around Booubyjan
Penwhaupell; Ban Ban	Blairmore	Stockhaven; Boompa
Aranbanga; Wahoon	Booubyjan	Malarga
Windera; Kitoba	Cobbs Hill	Tansey

Booubyjan is a rural locality in the Gympie Region, Queensland, Australia. In the 2021 census, Booubyjan had a population of 98 people.

== Geography ==
Booubyjan is approximately 250 kilometres (160 mi) NW of Brisbane.

== History ==
It was founded in the early 19th century by the Lawless brothers, Clement and Paul.

The town's name is believed to be an Aboriginal word, probably from the Waka language group, indicating turn back, which was originally used as the name for a pastoral run.

Land in Booubyjan was open for selection on 17 April 1877; 63 square miles (160 km^{2}) were available.

Booubyjan State School opened on 15 October 1934. It closed on 11 December 1987. In 1952, the school was south of the Old Murgon Gayndah Road (approx 25.96543°S 151.88555°E).

== Demographics ==
In the 2016 census, Booubyjan had a population of 109 people.

In the 2021 census, Booubyjan had a population of 98 people.

== Heritage listings ==
Booubyjan has a number of heritage-listed sites, including:

- Booubyjan Homestead, Booubyjan Road

== Education ==
There are no schools in Booubyjan. The nearest government primary schools are Windera State School in neighbouring Windera to the south-west, Coalstoun Lakes State School in Coalstoun Lakes to the north, and Goomeri State School in Goomeri to the south-east. Goomeri State School provides secondary schooling to Year 10, as does Proston State School in Proston to the south-west. For schooling to Year 12, the nearest government secondary schools are Burnett State College in Gayndah to the north-west and Murgon State High School in Murgon to the south. However, some parts of Booubyjan would be too far from these Year 12 schools for a daily commute; the alternatives are distance education and boarding school.
