= Byrnestown =

- Suburb
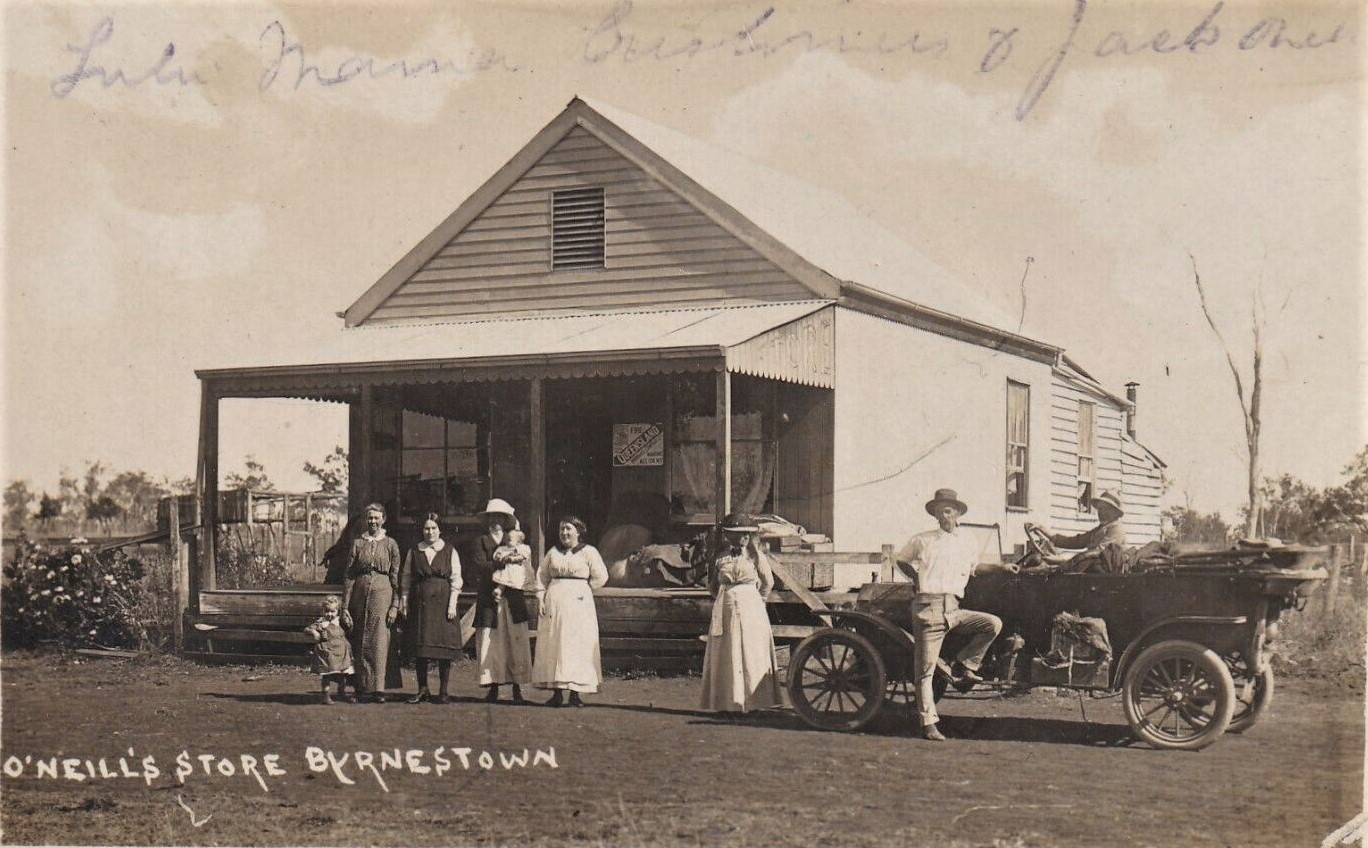
- O'Neill's Store in Byrnestown, 1919

- Interactive map of Byrnestown
- Coordinates: 25.5219°S 151.7677°E
- Country: Australia
- State: Queensland
- LGA: North Burnett Region
- Location: 22.9 km (14.2 mi) NW of Coalstoun Lakes; 25.0 km (15.5 mi) NE of Gayndah; 125 km (78 mi) W of Maryborough; 125 km (78 mi) SW of Bundaberg; 320 km (200 mi) NNW of Brisbane

Government
  - State electorate: Callide
  - Federal division: Flynn

Area
  - Total: 40.2 km^{2} (15.5 sq mi)

Population
  - Total: 27 (2021 census)
  - Density: 0.672/km^{2} (1.74/sq mi)
- Time zone: UTC+10:00 (AEST)
- Postcode: 4625
Suburbs around Byrnestown
Wetheron	Wetheron	Gooroolba
Wetheron	Byrnestown	Gooroolba
Wetheron	Ginoondan	Ginoondan

Byrnestown is a rural locality in the North Burnett Region, Queensland, Australia. It was established as one of the first communes in Queensland. In the 2021 census, Byrnestown had a population of 27 people.

== Geography ==
Wetheron Creek forms most of the southern boundary of the locality.

The Gayndah Mount Perry Road enters the locality from the south (Ginoondan) and exits to the north (Wetheron).

Apart from the small residential town area around the site of the former railway station, the land use is predominantly grazing on native vegetation.

== History ==
In response to the idea of communes promulgated by utopian William Lane, in 1893 the Queensland Government legislated the Queensland Co-operative Communities Land Settlement Act to allow a group of 30 or more men and their families to establish a commune in Queensland. This led to many groups forming to pursue the goal of establishing a commune; one of these groups called themselves Byrnestown after the then Queensland Attorney-General Thomas Joseph Byrnes (who became Premier of Queensland in 1898).

In late 1893, sites near Roma were deemed too far from the town. In January 1893, the Byrnestown group inspected land in the Burnett area and found it suitable, having a water supply from the Wetherton Creek and frontage to the prospective railway to Gayndah. As a result, the Byrnestown commune (comprising 34 members) was registered on 24 February 1894 receiving 4,600 acres (1,900 ha) for an 8-year term. Another group calling themselves Resolute selected land immediately to the east of the Byrnestown group, while a third group Bon Accord also took land in the Burnett area at Bon Accord.

The first of the Byrnestown settlers arrived in March 1894. Although all communes were given initial funds, by June 1894, Byrnestown requested and received additional financial assistance. By October 1894, there were 169 people in the Byrnestown commune: 34 men, 28 wives and 107 children. The group had erected numerous bark dwellings, farm buildings and were beginning work on a school building, but had made more limited progress on clearing and planting the land.

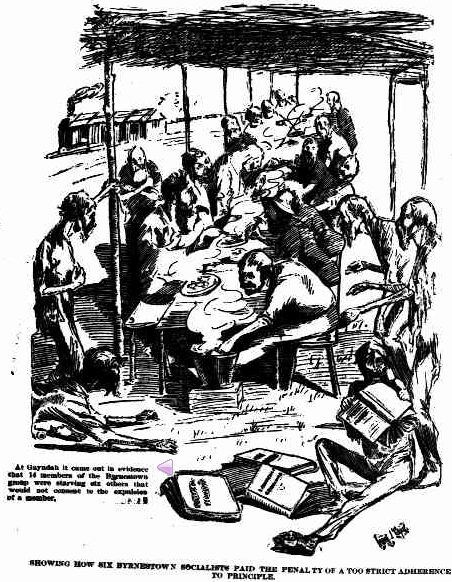
"Showing how six Byrnestown socialists paid the penalty of a too strict adherence to principle", cartoon, 1895

The Byrnestown commune did not succeed. As early as November 1894, there were allegations (denied by the group) that some of their members were working outside the commune but not contributing their wages to the commune as their agreement required. The following month some members were petitioning the government for funds, saying that the commune's management committee was denying them food. At the agricultural show at Degilbo in February 1895, it was revealed that 6 men had left the group and a further 9 were refusing to work, with the group's secretary suggesting the internal disputes arose from differences in nationality and religion. An inspection in April 1895 reported on limited progress at cultivation of the land, possibly linked to the number of men in the group working outside the commune. By July 1895, members of group had resorted to legal action over the management committee refusal to provide food to members who disagreed with their decisions. Byrnestown was not alone in its failure; in August 1895 a report by the Under-Secretary for Agriculture revealed most of the communes established were "in a state of collapse" and that there was little prospect of them being economically self-supporting.

One small success for the commune was the opening of the Byrnestown Provisional School on 4 September 1895. However, the Byrnestown commune soon complained that children from the neighbouring Resolute commune were attending their school without contributing to it. It was originally housed in a bark humpy, but, through the efforts of Roman Catholic priest Father Michael Joseph McKiernan, it was replaced by a more substantial building. It became Byrnestown State School in 1909. A second school, Byrnestown Central State School, opened on 20 May 1913, after which the first school was often known as Old Byrnestown School. The old school closed in 1931 and its buildings were relocated in 1932 to Wilson Valley. In 1938, Byrnestown Central State School was renamed Byrnestown State School. It closed on 31 December 1970. (Old) Byrnestown State School was on the western side of Gayndah - Mount Perry Road (25.54858°S 151.77670°E). Byrnestown (Central) State School was at 28 Byrnes Parade (corner of King George Avenue, 25.52324°S 151.75872°E).

In October 1895, the Byrnestown committee instituted a system of punishments for any member (or their wife) who criticised their commune or suggested it might not be a success. In December 1895, the Queensland Government passed legislation to enable communes to be dissolved and the communal land divided among the members. The members of Byrnestown immediately petitioned the Queensland Government to divide their communal land into individual portions. In April 1896, 2,560 acres (1,040 ha) of the Byrnestown communal land was divided among 16 of its members, bringing the commune to an end. Those members who chose to take up individual land generally succeeded in their enterprise and were described less than two years later in February 1896 as "doing pretty well", suggesting that dissolution of the commune had rid the community of those men unsuited to agriculture or generally disinclined to work.

A report by R. W. Winks of the Department of Agriculture, Brisbane, surveying for the proposed Degilbo to Gayndah railway line extension, dated 10 November 1897 stated:- "The first really good piece of country of any extent begins some little distance from the coach stage at Wetheron, Two Mile, extending beyond the head station and running thence in a south-westerly direction to Oakey Creek. This belt, which takes in the whole of what was the Byrnestown and part of the Resolute and Bon Accord Groups, about 8 miles (13 km) in length, and varying in breadth from 3 to 4 miles, is on the whole good land. It is principally composed of fine, black and chocolate soil ridges, even in contour, and in many places lightly timbered with broad-leafed ironbark and a kind of bloodwood. In some parts there is scarcely any timber, from which fact a portion of this zone is known locally as the Wetheron Clear Lands. Want of water is the chief drawback, but from some wells I saw on what was once group property, it would appear that good water can be obtained by comparatively shallow sinking. The average depth of the wells seemed about 40 feet (12 m)."

In 1903, there were over 1,000 acres (400 ha) under cultivation, growing mostly maize, potatoes and fodder crops; the main barrier to greater prosperity was the distance to the railway.

Byrnestown Post Office opened by November 1903 (a receiving office had been open from 1898) and closed in 1911. Byrnestown Railway Station Post Office opened by June 1910 (a receiving office had been open from 1909, briefly known as Ginoon) and closed in 1974.

The Mungar Junction to Monto railway line opened from Degilbo to Wetheron via Byrnestown on 21 December 1905. Byrnestown was served by the Byrnestown railway station (25.5237°S 151.7615°E). The last train on the railway line was in 2008 and in 2012 it was announced the line was officially closed.

In September 1912, 54 allotments were sold in the town of Byrnestown.

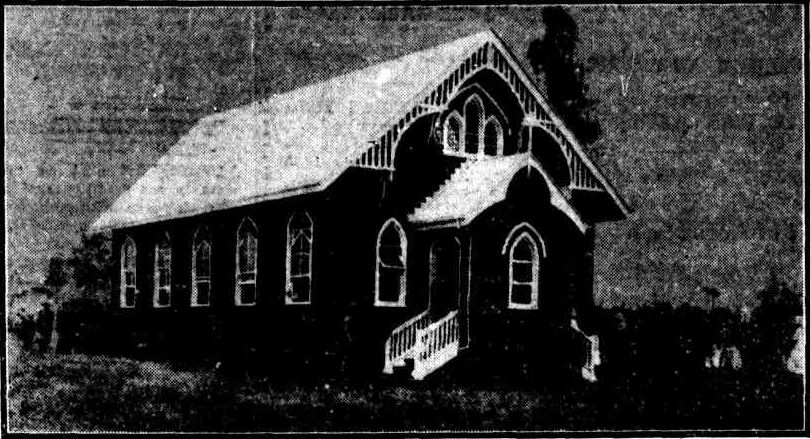
Church of the Sacred Heart, 1925

In August 1913, local residents desired to establish a Roman Catholic church in the town. At that time, the town had a hall which was used both for church services and recreational purposes, but following the establishment of a concert hall by Mr Christensen, the hall was only used for church services. Peter McSween senior donated an acre of land for the church and the residents decided to relocate the old hall to the donated land. On 25 July 1914, Archbishop James Duhig opened St Peter's Catholic Church with 250 people in attendance. The new church was made of weatherboard and was 40 by 20 feet (12.2 by 6.1 m) with a sacristry and vestry in the rear of the church and an "artistic" porch at the front. The building was designed and built by local contractor Harry Head. On 1 December 1923, the church was blown down in a storm. It was decided in August 1924 to construct a new church rather than try to repair the damaged building. The contract for the new church was given to George William Jealous of Gayndah at a cost of over £1000. The new Catholic Church of the Sacred Heart was opened in Byrnestown on 22 February 1925 by Roman Catholic Archbishop James Duhig. The church was damaged in a cyclone in 1959. In 1969 the church was moved to Gayndah to serve as the church hall for St Joseph's Catholic Church there. To reduce the risk of future cyclone damage, the roof was lowered by reducing the height of the walls and reducing the pitch of the roof.

In May 1931, a railway carriage carrying the Queensland Premier Arthur Edward Moore and Robert Boyd MLA and their wives came detached during shunting operations at the Gooroolba junction and rolled away, gathering speed down a streep grade. It hurtled, swaying dangerously, through Byrnestown railway station and eventually came to a halt five miles later on flat ground near the Wetheron railway station. Nobody was hurt.

== Demographics ==
In the 2016 census, Byrnestown had a population of 34 people.

In the 2021 census, Byrnestown had a population of 27 people.

== Heritage listing ==
The Byrnestown Commune and Cemetery are listed on the North Burnett Regional Council's local heritage register. The cemetery is on Cemetery Road (25.5514°S 151.7705°E).

== Education ==
There are no schools in Byrnestown. The nearest government primary schools are Coalstoun Lakes State School in Coalstoun Lakes to the south-east and Gayndah State School in Gayndah to the south-west. The nearest government secondary school is Burnett State College in Gayndah.
