= Dundarrah, Queensland =

Dundarrah
- Suburb
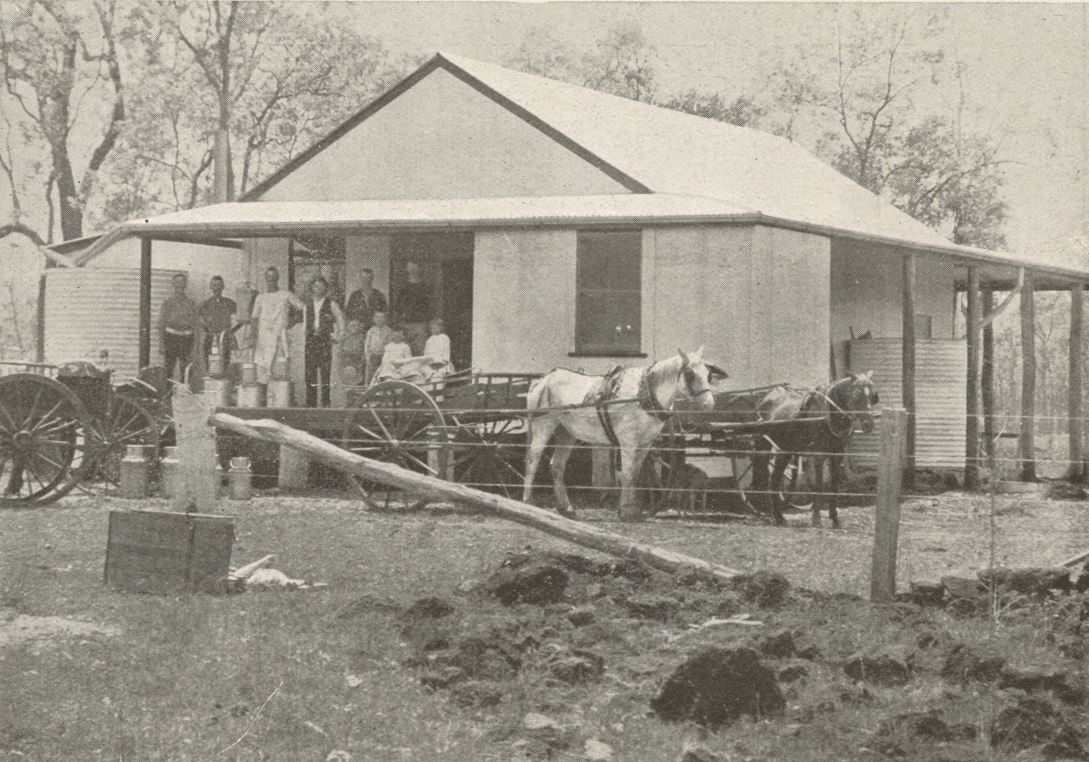
- Dundarrah cheese factory, 1915

- Interactive map of Dundarrah
- Coordinates: 25.6525°S 151.9358°E
- Country: Australia
- State: Queensland
- LGA: North Burnett Region
- Location: 5.5 km (3.4 mi) SE of Coalstoun Lakes; 29.5 km (18.3 mi) SW of Biggenden; 46.5 km (28.9 mi) E of Gayndah; 114 km (71 mi) W of Maryborough; 325 km (202 mi) NNW of Brisbane

Government
  - State electorate: Callide
  - Federal division: Flynn

Area
  - Total: 33.1 km^{2} (12.8 sq mi)

Population
  - Total: 4 (2021 census)
  - Density: 0.121/km^{2} (0.31/sq mi)
- Time zone: UTC+10:00 (AEST)
- Postcode: 4625
Suburbs around Dundarrah
Coalstoun Lakes	Biggenden	Biggenden
Coalstoun Lakes	Dundarrah	Stockhaven
Ban Ban	Stockhaven	Stockhaven

Dundarrah is a rural locality in the North Burnett Region, Queensland, Australia. In the 2021 census, Dundarrah had a population of 4 people.

== Geography ==
The Isis Highway enters the locality from the north-west (Coalstoun Lakes) and forms the western boundary of the locality, exiting to the south-east (Ban Ban / Stockhaven). The western boundary of the Mount Walsh National Park in neighbouring Stockhaven forms the eastern boundary of Dundarrah.

The land use is crop growing in the west of the locality with grazing on native vegetation in other parts of the locality.

== History ==
The Dundarrah cheese factory opened in November 1914. It was the first cheese factory in the Burnett district. It no longer operates.

== Demographics ==
In the 2016 census, Dundarrah had a population of 3 people.

In the 2021 census, Dundarrah had a population of 4 people.

== Education ==
There are no schools in Dundarrah. The nearest government primary school is Coalstoun Lakes State School in neighbouring Coalstoun Lakes to the north-west. The nearest government secondary schools are Biggenden State School (to Year 10) in Biggenden to the north-east and Burnett State College (to Year 12) in Gayndah to the west.
