= Ideraway Creek Railway Bridge =

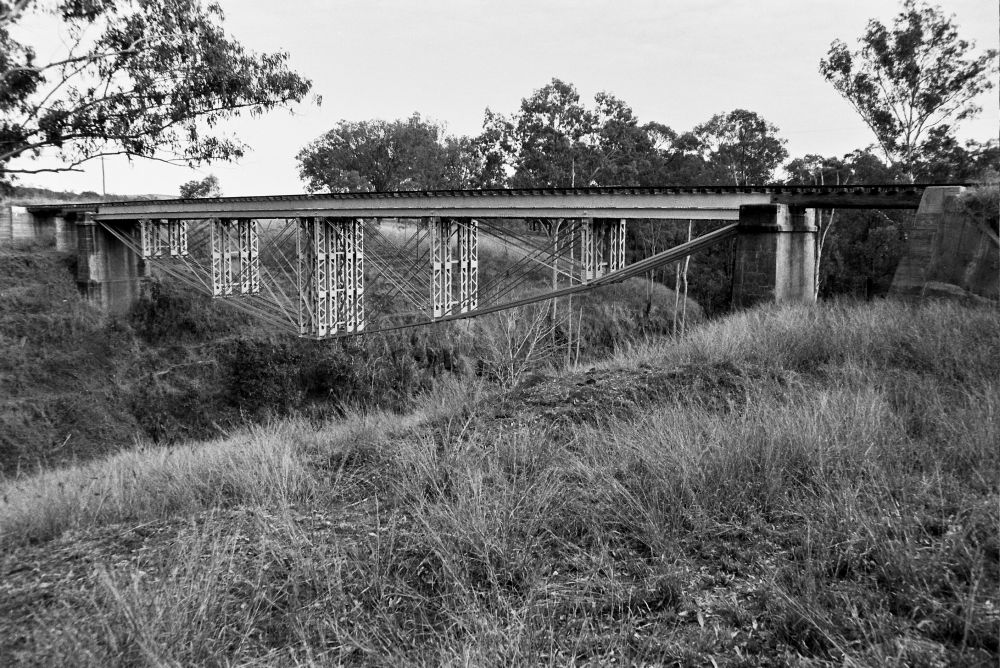
- Ideraway Creek Railway Bridge

- Location within Queensland Location within Australia
- 25.5828°S 151.616°E
- Location: Mungar–Monto Line, Ideraway, North Burnett Region, Queensland, Australia

History
- Design period: 1900–1914 (early 20th century)
- Built: 1906–1907

Site notes
- Architect: William Pagan

Queensland Heritage Register
- Official name: Ideraway Creek Railway Bridge (Ideraway)
- Type: state heritage (built)
- Designated: 21 October 1992
- Reference no.: 600519
- Significant period: 1899, 1900s (fabric)
- Significant components: pier/s (bridge)
- Builders: day labour

Ideraway Creek Railway Bridge is a heritage-listed railway bridge at Mungar–Monto Line, Ideraway, North Burnett Region, Queensland, Australia. It was designed by William Pagan and built from 1906 to 1907 using day labour. It was added to the Queensland Heritage Register on 21 October 1992.

== History ==
Construction of the section of railway from Wetheron to Gayndah began in March 1906 using day labour. Completion of the line was delayed building two bridges of special designs over gorges between Ideraway and Gayndah. The Ideraway Creek Railway Bridge was designed and drawings signed by Chief Engineer, William Pagan, on 10 December 1906. The extension was opened for traffic on 16 December 1907. The other bridge is the Steep Rocky Creek Railway Bridge.

== Description ==
The Ideraway Creek bridge is one of the most unusual bridges in Australia. It demonstrates the economic re-use of part of the erection truss used to build the Burdekin River Rail Bridge at Macrossan between Townsville and Charters Towers opened in 1899. The complete truss was 250 feet (76 m) long whereas the Ideraway Creek bridge uses only 150 feet (46 m) of the span. The pinned construction and multiple members of the truss were originally designed for rapid assembly and disassembly.

The bridge work consists of:

- Wetheron embankment
- 1-by-3-by-18-foot (0.30 m × 0.91 m × 5.49 m) timber longitudinals, timber trestle, common timber trestle
- 1-by-3-by-20-foot (0.30 m × 0.91 m × 6.10 m) timber longitudinals, common timber trestle, common concrete pier
- 1-by-4-by-150-foot (0.30 m × 1.22 m × 45.72 m) deck-type pin-jointed fishbelly truss (ex Burdekin River bridge, Macrossan) with transom tops, six sets of two steel longitudinals, common concrete piers
- 1-by-3-by-20-foot (0.30 m × 0.91 m × 6.10 m) timber longitudinals, common concrete pier, common timber trestle
- 1-by-3-by-18-foot (0.30 m × 0.91 m × 5.49 m) timber longitudinals, common timber trestle, timber trestle
- Gayndah embankment

== Heritage listing ==
Ideraway Creek Railway Bridge was listed on the Queensland Heritage Register on 21 October 1992 having satisfied the following criteria.

The place is important in demonstrating the evolution or pattern of Queensland's history.

The deck-type pin-jointed fishbelly truss main span is unique in Australia. It is the only bridge of its type in Queensland and therefore the longest span of its type in Queensland. It innovatively re-uses the falsework of the Burdekin River Bridge at Macrossan of 1899. (This falsework had been re-used on two separate bridges prior to this one).

The bridge demonstrates the economies employed in the construction of Queensland's railways.

The place demonstrates rare, uncommon or endangered aspects of Queensland's cultural heritage.

The deck-type pin-jointed fishbelly truss main span is unique in Australia. It is the only bridge of its type in Queensland and therefore the longest span of its type in Queensland.

The place is important in demonstrating a high degree of creative or technical achievement at a particular period.

It innovatively re-uses the falsework of the Burdekin River Bridge at Macrossan of 1899 (This falsework had been re-used on two separate bridges prior to this one). The bridge demonstrates the economies employed in the construction of Queensland's railways.

The Official Register of Engineering Heritage Markers listed

- Degilbo–Mundubbera Railway Bridges in October 2016. A total of 12 bridges that are situated on the Mungar Junction to Monto railway line, including the Ideraway Creek Railway Bridge, are recognized with one Engineering Heritage Marker representing the “best example of a collection of historic railway bridges in Australia”.
