= Blairmore, Queensland =

Blairmore
- Suburb
- Interactive map of Blairmore
- Coordinates: 25.8094°S 151.9177°E
- Country: Australia
- State: Queensland
- LGA: North Burnett Region
- Location: 24.6 km (15.3 mi) S of Coalstoun Lakes; 36.9 km (22.9 mi) SE of Gayndah; 121 km (75 mi) NW of Gympie; 287 km (178 mi) NNW of Brisbane

Government
  - State electorate: Callide
  - Federal division: Flynn

Area
  - Total: 120.4 km^{2} (46.5 sq mi)

Population
  - Total: 0 (2021 census)
  - Density: 0.000/km^{2} (0.000/sq mi)
- Time zone: UTC+10:00 (AEST)
- Postcode: 4625
Suburbs around Blairmore
Ban Ban	Stockhaven	Stockhaven
Booubyjan	Blairmore	Stockhaven
Booubyjan	Booubyjan	Booubyjan

Blairmore is a rural locality in the North Burnett Region, Queensland, Australia. In the 2021 census, Blairmore had "no people or a very low population".

== Geography ==
The Burnett Highway enters the locality from the north-west (Ban Ban) and passes through the north-western part of the locality, exiting to the west (Booubyjan).

Blairmore is within the North East Coast drainage basin, specifically within the catchment of the Burnett River.

The Ban Ban National Park is in the south-east of the locality, extending into neighbouring Booubyjan. Apart from this protected area, the land use is grazing on native vegetation.

== Demographics ==
In the 2016 census, Blairmore had "no people or a very low population".

In the 2021 census, Blairmore had "no people or a very low population".

== Education ==
There are no schools in Blairmore. The nearest government primary school is Coalstoun Lakes State School in Coalstoun Lakes to the north. The nearest government secondary school is Burnett State College in Gayndah to the north-west.
