= Yenda, Queensland =

Yenda
- Suburb
- Interactive map of Yenda
- Coordinates: 25.3833°S 151.6166°E
- Country: Australia
- State: Queensland
- LGA: North Burnett Region
- Location: 26.0 km (16.2 mi) NNE of Gayndah; 173 km (107 mi) SW of Bundaberg; 183 km (114 mi) NW of Gympie; 349 km (217 mi) NNW of Brisbane

Government
  - State electorate: Callide
  - Federal division: Flynn

Area
  - Total: 349.6 km^{2} (135.0 sq mi)

Population
  - Total: 16 (2021 census)
  - Density: 0.0458/km^{2} (0.119/sq mi)
- Time zone: UTC+10:00 (AEST)
- Postcode: 4625
Suburbs around Yenda
Mungy	Mount Perry	Mingo
Branch Creek	Yenda	Mingo
Reids Creek	Ideraway; Mount Lawless	Wetheron

Yenda is a rural locality in the North Burnett Region, Queensland, Australia. In the 2021 census, Yenda had a population of 16 people.

== Geography ==
The Burnett River forms the south-western boundary of the locality.

Mount Lawless is a mountain in the far south-east of the locality (25.5232°S 151.6558°E) rising to 277 metres (909 ft) above sea level. It is close to, but not within, the locality of Mount Lawless to the south.

== History ==
The locality takes its name from a pastoral run taken up by Robert Wilkin. It is believed to be an Aboriginal word meaning swamp.

Yenda Provisional School opened on 8 June 1925 as a half-time school in conjunction with Mingo Crossing Provisional School (meaning they shared one teacher between them). Both schools closed circa December 1926 due to poor student numbers.

== Demographics ==
In the 2011 census, the combined localities of Ideraway and Yenda had a population of 225 people.

In the 2016 census, Yenda had a population of 23 people.

In the 2021 census, Yenda had a population of 16 people.

== Education ==
There are no schools in Yenda. The nearest government primary schools are Mount Perry State School in neighbouring Mount Perry to the north, Binjour Plateau State School in Binjour to the south-west, and Gayndah State School in Gayndah.

The nearest government secondary school is Burnett State College, also in Gaynah. However, students in the north-east of Yenda may be too distant to attend this school; the alternatives are distance education and boarding school.
