= Campbell Creek, Queensland =

Campbell Creek
- Suburb
- Interactive map of Campbell Creek
- Coordinates: 25.665°S 151.7136°E
- Country: Australia
- State: Queensland
- LGA: North Burnett Region
- Location: 17.9 km (11.1 mi) SE of Gayndah; 133 km (83 mi) W of Maryborough; 141 km (88 mi) NW of Gympie; 316 km (196 mi) NNW of Brisbane

Government
  - State electorate: Callide
  - Federal division: Flynn

Area
  - Total: 46.3 km^{2} (17.9 sq mi)
- Elevation: 131 m (430 ft)

Population
  - Total: 0 (2021 census)
  - Density: 0.000/km^{2} (0.000/sq mi)
- Time zone: UTC+10:00 (AEST)
- Postcode: 4625
- Mean max temp: 28.1 °C (82.6 °F)
- Mean min temp: 14.4 °C (57.9 °F)
- Annual rainfall: 694.9 mm (27.36 in)
Suburbs around Campbell Creek
Gayndah	Ginoondan	Ginoondan
The Limits	Campbell Creek	Ban Ban
The Limits	Penwhaupell	Ban Ban

Campbell Creek is a rural locality in the North Burnett Region, Queensland, Australia. In the 2021 census, Campbell Creek had "no people or a very low population".

== Geography ==
The locality takes its name from the Campbell Creek watercourse which has its source is more mountainous area (up to 460 metres (1,510 ft)) in the south of the locality and flows northward toward the lower flatter land (100 metres (330 ft) in the north of the locality. Barambah Creek forms the north-western boundary of the suburb and the two creeks have their confluence on the locality's northern boundary (25.616112°S 151.693054°E).

Mount Brian is in the east of the locality (25.6702°S 151.7266°E) rising to 292 metres (958 ft) above sea level.

A short segment of the Burnett Highway forms part of the locality's northern boundary.

== Climate ==
Campbell Creek has a humid subtropical climate (Köppen: Cfa), with hot, relatively wet summers and mild, dry winters with cool nights. Average maxima vary from 32.6 °C (90.7 °F) in January to 22.1 °C (71.8 °F) in July while average minima fluctuate between 20.4 °C (68.7 °F) in January and February and 6.9 °C (44.4 °F) in July. Mean average annual precipitation is moderately low, 694.9 mm (27.36 in), and is highly concentrated during the summer. Rainfall is spread across 57.7 precipitation days (above the 1.0 mm (0.039 in) threshold). Extreme temperatures have ranged from 43.6 °C (110.5 °F) on 6 January 1994 to −3.3 °C (26.1 °F) on 6 July 1982. All climate data was sourced from Brian Pastures, which is a research facility located 3.9 km (2.4 mi) east of Campbell Creek.

Climate data for Campbell Creek (25º39'48"S, 151º45'00"E, 131 m AMSL) (1955-2020 normals & extremes)
Month	Jan	Feb	Mar	Apr	May	Jun	Jul	Aug	Sep	Oct	Nov	Dec	Year
Record high °C (°F)	43.6 (110.5)	41.4 (106.5)	42.5 (108.5)	37.0 (98.6)	32.5 (90.5)	30.6 (87.1)	28.6 (83.5)	37.0 (98.6)	40.0 (104.0)	41.5 (106.7)	42.1 (107.8)	43.6 (110.5)	43.6 (110.5)
Mean daily maximum °C (°F)	32.6 (90.7)	31.8 (89.2)	30.9 (87.6)	28.5 (83.3)	25.3 (77.5)	22.4 (72.3)	22.1 (71.8)	23.9 (75.0)	26.9 (80.4)	29.4 (84.9)	30.8 (87.4)	32.3 (90.1)	28.1 (82.5)
Mean daily minimum °C (°F)	20.4 (68.7)	20.3 (68.5)	18.6 (65.5)	15.3 (59.5)	11.8 (53.2)	8.0 (46.4)	6.9 (44.4)	8.1 (46.6)	11.3 (52.3)	15.0 (59.0)	17.5 (63.5)	19.4 (66.9)	14.4 (57.9)
Record low °C (°F)	13.2 (55.8)	13.4 (56.1)	10.0 (50.0)	4.8 (40.6)	−0.3 (31.5)	−2.8 (27.0)	−3.3 (26.1)	−1.6 (29.1)	2.5 (36.5)	3.6 (38.5)	6.2 (43.2)	10.2 (50.4)	−3.3 (26.1)
Average precipitation mm (inches)	103.4 (4.07)	97.5 (3.84)	69.1 (2.72)	32.3 (1.27)	35.1 (1.38)	29.6 (1.17)	30.1 (1.19)	27.6 (1.09)	30.6 (1.20)	64.0 (2.52)	72.5 (2.85)	105.3 (4.15)	694.9 (27.36)
Average precipitation days (≥ 1.0 mm)	7.1	6.4	5.8	3.7	3.8	3.1	3.2	3.0	3.0	5.4	5.9	7.3	57.7
Mean monthly sunshine hours	254.2	214.7	244.9	237.0	217.0	213.0	232.5	257.3	264.0	272.8	264.0	263.5	2,934.9
Percentage possible sunshine	61	59	64	69	64	67	70	74	74	69	66	64	67
Source: Bureau of Meteorology (1955-2020 normals & extremes)

== Demographics ==
In the 2016 census, Campbell Creek had a population of 7 people.

In the 2021 census, Campbell Creek had "no people or a very low population".

== Education ==
There are no schools in Campbell Creek. The nearest government primary school is Gayndah State School in neighbouring Gayndah to the north-west. The nearest government secondary schools is Burnett State College, also in Gayndah.

== Facilities ==
The Brian Pastures Research Facility, operated by the Queensland Department of Primary Industries is on 2,140 hectares (5,300 acres) at 819 Brian Pastures Road (25.6529°S 151.7459°E). It primarily conducts research on beef cattle (with a herd of approximately 500 animals) in addition to some research into cropping and horticulture.
