= Mount Lawless, Queensland =

Mount Lawless
- Suburb
- Interactive map of Mount Lawless
- Coordinates: 25.5483°S 151.6441°E
- Country: Australia
- State: Queensland
- LGA: North Burnett Region
- Location: 16.7 km (10.4 mi) NE of Gayndah; 164 km (102 mi) SW of Bundaberg; 175 km (109 mi) WSW of Hervey Bay; 354 km (220 mi) NNW of Brisbane

Government
  - State electorate: Callide
  - Federal division: Flynn

Area
  - Total: 12.3 km^{2} (4.7 sq mi)

Population
  - Total: 9 (2021 census)
  - Density: 0.73/km^{2} (1.90/sq mi)
- Time zone: UTC+10:00 (AEST)
- Postcode: 4625
Suburbs around Mount Lawless
| Yenda | Yenda | Yenda |
| Yenda | Mount Lawless | Wetheron |
| Ideraway | Ideraway | Bon Accord |

Mount Lawless is a rural locality in the North Burnett Region, Queensland, Australia. In the 2021 census, Mount Lawless had a population of 9 people.

== Geography ==
The Burnett River forms most of the eastern boundary. It drains a basin covering 33,210 square kilometres (12,820 sq mi) which is 1.9% of the total area of Queensland.

Despite its name, the mountain Mount Lawless is in the far south-east of the neighbouring locality of Yenda to the north.

The nearest large town is Gayndah which is 9.9 kilometres (6.2 mi) distant in a direct line or 16.7 kilometres (10.4 mi) by road.

The land use is predominantly grazing on native vegetation with some crop growing near the river.

== History ==
The area had started growing small crops, citrus orchards, grain and dairy cattle by 1905. The Gayndah area is still known for these primary industries, with irrigation, today.

At the time the Burnett River Bridge was being built (1906-7), the site selected was "said to possess considerable scenic beauty. The exact spot is on a basalt crossing, on either side of which are large lagoons, in which fish and fowl abound."

An area of 160 acres (65 ha) was reserved for township purposes at Mount Lawless, near Gayndah in 1909.

The final stage of the Mungar Junction to Monto railway line opened from Wetherton to Gayndah via Mount Lawless on 16 December 1907 without any ceremony. It was officially opened in April 1908 by the Queensland Minister for Railways George Kerr. The locality was served by two railway stations, both now abandoned:

- Mount Lawless railway station (25.5402°S 151.6520°E)
- Dappil railway station (25.5506°S 151.6376°E)

The last train on the railway line was in 2008 and in 2012 it was announced the line was officially closed.

== Floods ==
The Burnett River Bridge is also known as the Mt. Lawless railway bridge and is not to be confused with the Burnett Railway Bridge in Bundaberg.

This low-level railway bridge was built over the rapids in the Burnett River at Mount Lawless during 1906/1907. The bridge engineer said at the time that it was "the longest bridge of its kind in Queensland ... and he felt sure that it would resist every pressure likely to be met with." The bridge was flooded in 1911, 1918, 1921, 1928, 1929, 1934, 1949, 1950, 1954 and 1956. It suffered major damage in the 1947 floods when nine spans (162 feet (49 m)) of the 830-foot (250 m) length of the bridge were washed away. The damage occurred from 11 February 1947 and the bridge was repaired and restricted services resumed six weeks later.

The Queensland Government Irrigation and Water Supply Commission monitored a gauging station (No. 279) at the Mount Lawless railway bridge, one of several along the Burnett River and its tributaries.

The construction of the Jones Weir at Mundubbera, upstream from Mount Lawless, commenced in April 1947. It was officially opened on Saturday 23 June 1951. The weir is one of the oldest concrete weirs commissioned in Queensland. Construction slowed between December 1948 and March 1949 due to flooding. Other upstream weirs followed.

The 2013 floods again removed the centre spans of the bridge, despite earlier flood protection measures.

== Demographics ==
In the 2016 census, Mount Lawless had a population of 12 people.

In the 2021 census, Mount Lawless had a population of 9 people.

== Heritage listing ==
The Official Register of Engineering Heritage Markers listed

- Degilbo-Mundubbera Railway Bridges in October 2016. A total of 12 bridges that are situated on the Mungar Junction to Monto railway line, including the Burnett River Bridge, are recognized with one Engineering Heritage Marker representing the "best example of a collection of historic railway bridges in Australia".

== Education ==
There are no schools in Mount Lawless. The nearest government primary school is Gayndah State School in Gayndah to the south. The nearest government secondary school is Burnett State College, also in Gayndah.
