= Ginoondan =

- Suburb
- Interactive map of Ginoondan
- Coordinates: 25.5997°S 151.7788°E
- Country: Australia
- State: Queensland
- LGA: North Burnett Region
- Location: 13.9 km (8.6 mi) E of Gayndah; 134 km (83 mi) SW of Bundaberg; 145 km (90 mi) WSW of Hervey Bay; 318 km (198 mi) NNW of Brisbane

Government
  - State electorate: Callide
  - Federal division: Flynn

Area
  - Total: 109.2 km^{2} (42.2 sq mi)

Population
  - Total: 12 (2021 census)
  - Density: 0.110/km^{2} (0.285/sq mi)
- Time zone: UTC+10:00 (AEST)
- Postcode: 4625
Suburbs around Ginoondan
| Wetheron | Byrnestown; Gooroolba | Wilson Valley |
| Gayndah | Ginoondan | Coalstoun Lakes |
| Campbell Creek | Ban Ban | Ban Ban |

Ginoondan is a rural locality in the North Burnett Region, Queensland, Australia. In the 2021 census, Ginoondan had a population of 12 people.

== Geography ==
The locality is bounded to the west and south-west by Barambah Creek.

The Burnett Highway enters the locality from the west (Gayndah / Campbell Creek) and exits to the south (Ban Ban).

Scrubby Mountain is in the north-east of the locality (25.5710°S 151.8088°E), rising to 332 metres (1,089 ft) above sea level.

The land use is predominantly grazing on native vegetation with some crop growing in the south-west of the locality.

== History ==
Ginoondan Provisional School opened on 26 October 1903. On 1 January 1909, it became Ginoondan State School. It closed in 1949. It was on the eastern corner of the Burnett Highway and the Gayndah Mount Perry Road (25.59762°S 151.73406°E).

== Demographics ==
In the 2016 census, Ginoondan had a population of 16 people.

In the 2021 census, Ginoondan had a population of 12 people.

== Education ==
There are no schools in Ginoondan. The nearest government primary schools are Gayndah State School in neighbouring Gayndah to the west and Coalstoun Lakes State School in neighbouring Coalstoun Lakes to the east. The nearest government secondary schools are Burnett State College (to Year 12) in Gayndah to the west and Biggenden State School (to Year 10) in Biggenden to the north-east. There is also a Catholic primary school in Gayndah.
