= Booubyjan Homestead =

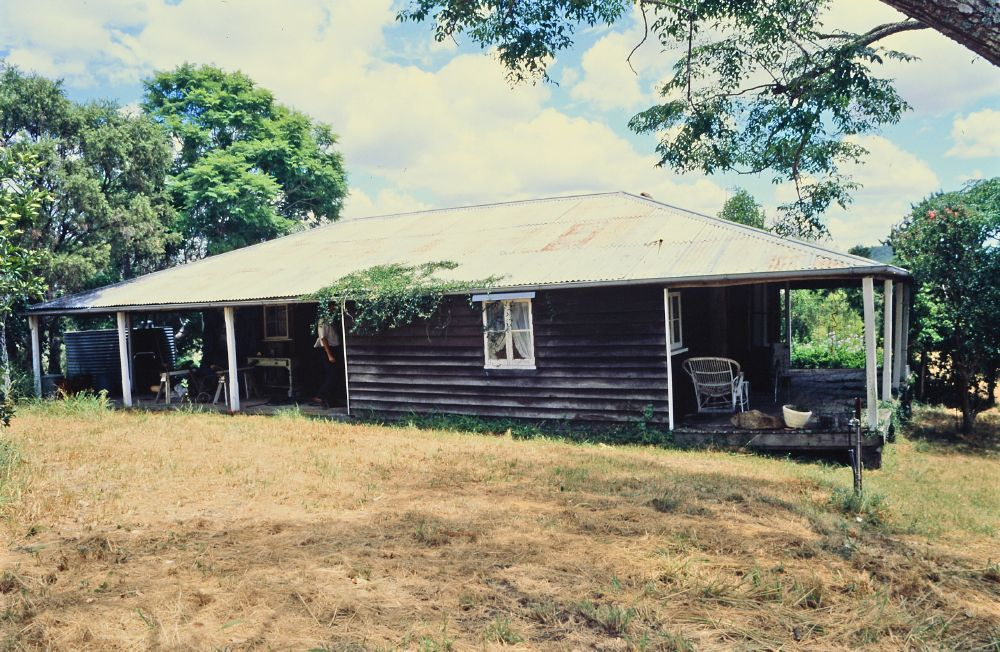
- Cottage at Booubyjan Homestead, 1996

- Location within Queensland Location within Australia
- 25.9422°S 151.958°E
- Location: Booubyjan Road, Booubyjan, Gympie Region, Queensland, Australia

History
- Design period: 1840s - 1860s (mid-19th century)
- Built: 1860s to 1870s

Queensland Heritage Register
- Official name: Booubyjan Homestead, Boonbyjan
- Type: state heritage (landscape, built)
- Designated: 21 October 1992
- Reference no.: 600639
- Significant period: 1860s-1870s (historical); 1860s-1870s (fabric)
- Significant components: residential accommodation - caretaker's quarters, furniture/fittings, trees/plantings, out building/s, dining room, views from, residential accommodation - main house, views to

Booubyjan Homestead is a heritage-listed homestead at Booubyjan Road, Booubyjan, Gympie Region, Queensland, Australia. It was built from the 1860s to the 1870s circa. It was added to the Queensland Heritage Register on 21 October 1992.

== History ==
Booubyjan Homestead is a complex of timber structures built by the Lawless family at varying times in the nineteenth century as their accommodation needs increased. The homestead has, variously, been referred to by a number of variations of the spelling of its title in both personal and business correspondence, Government publications and histories of the area. Such variations include Boombyjan, Boonbyjan, Booubijan and Boombagan.

The Lawless' occupation of the Booubyjan run began in 1847, when two brothers Paul and Clement Lawless took up three properties in the Burnett River district. The Lawless brothers arrived in Australia from County Cork, Ireland in 1841. After initially establishing themselves on a farm in the Hunter Valley, the brothers moved to the Moreton Bay district, where they took up the Nindooimba run in 1842. With the intention of finding land more suitable for sheep farming, Paul and Clement Lawless joined an expedition travelling to the Brisbane Valley, where they discovered their future home, Booubyjan, named after a nearby large rock.

A letter which Clement Lawless wrote to his sister-in-law, Alicia Lawless-Pyne, dated March 1849, provides many details about the early occupation of the Booubyjan run by the Lawless family. Lawless writes of the effects of the low wool prices and the consequent economic hardships which saw the importation and employment of many "Celestials" on the station. The wages books from the station attest to the large proportion of Chinese labourers at Booubyjan, who were, it seems, paid considerably less than their European counterparts. The problems with language were overcome because the Chinese did everything by signs most readily and were excellent at tending sheep.

This letter goes on to give details of the early ownership of the station: "We have not got any Title as yet from the Governor to our Station, which is keeping us in hot water, but expect it during the year. A great deal of business has accumulated in the Lands Office in consequence of a change in Squatting regulations; the whole of the country has to be surveyed before they can give Leases, which must occupy a long time."

And by 1850, the New South Wales Government Gazette (June 19) published a list of successful tenders for runs in Crown Lands beyond the settled districts. Paul Lawless is listed with Windera and Clement Lawless with "Boombagan". According to early Lands Department Registers the Lawless brothers ran a station called Booubyjan and this comprised three runs, namely Booubyjan, Boonimba and Windera. These Registers indicate that Paul was the sole proprietor of Windera and Clement the sole proprietor of Booubyjan run and both brothers oversaw the Boonimba run.

An early Register indicates that a lease was issued for the Booubyjan (therein referred to as Boombagan) and Windera Runs in 1862 for a term of 14 years for an annual rent of £14. However, under Section 55 of the Pastoral Leases Act of 1869, the Lawless' brothers surrendered their leases at both Booubyjan and Windera and were issued with new leases for the two runs in July 1869.

Clement Lawless returned to Ireland in about 1860 to marry and remained living in Kilcrone, Ireland until 1869 when he returned to Booubyjan for one year before, again, returning to his country of birth. In 1873 Clement sold his interest in both the Booubyjan station property and another family property, Imbil in the Mary Valley, purchased in 1857, to Ellen Lawless, the wife of his brother Paul. Around 1858, Paul Lawless had also returned to Britain where he married Ellen Nash in Bath, and the young couple set out for Australia in April 1859. Paul and Ellen had three children, and by 1865 it was necessary for the sake of Paul's health to return to Britain where he died shortly after. Ellen, who now held her husband's share in the Australian properties, and her young children spent some years travelling around Europe before returning to Booubyjan in late 1870. After Ellen's death in 1922, the property was bequeathed to her two sons, one of whom, William Burnett Lawless was actually residing at the homestead at the time of his mother's death. William and his wife, Beatrice Muriel Walker, did not have children, and the property was passed on William's death in 1945 to William's nephews, Ivan Desmond Lawless and Burnett Rhys Lawless, who were the sons of John Paul Lawless, then in residence at Windera. Burnett Rhys Lawless continued on at the homestead for many years until his death in 1995, and Booubyjan is now run by Burnett's son, Michael, along with his wife and children.

It is not possible to date the buildings and structures on the homestead with any degree of certainty. It seems that the oldest building is that known as the Dining Room, which is thought to have been previously used as a nursery. The Queensland Women's Historical Association placed their first "blue plaque" in the state on this building in 1960, giving its approximate age as being from 1860. Photographs dating from the 1870s suggest that the two other principal buildings, referred to as the Homestead and the Cottage, were built either during or before the early 1870s.

Early photographs of the head station at Booubyjan indicate that the complex has been subject to many changes, where buildings have been removed or added, and in some instances moved slightly. There is evidence, for example, that an elevated timber building to the south west of the Cottage was removed from the complex of buildings comprising the homestead at Booubyjan.

The 1950s saw the destruction of an early kitchen to the rear of the Dining Room, and its replacement with another kitchen built onto the rear of the Homestead. In the 1970s a storm unroofed both the Cottage and the Homestead, and these were replaced, though not in the previous steeply pitched Dutch gabled roof form, but simply with hipped corrugated iron roofs.

Photographs taken in 1928 by the travelling photographer of The Queenslander, show the remarkably unchanged state of the buildings from this time, particularly the interiors which retain many pieces of furniture and other items from earlier periods of inhabitancy.

== Description ==
Booubyjan Homestead is situated on a 9000-acre run in the Kilkivan Shire (later part of Gympie Region), about 14 kilometres (8.7 mi) north of the small town of Tansey, which is north of Goomeri.

The homestead is on an elevated section of the run, allowing comprehensive views of the surrounding run. The complex consists of timber buildings, linked by open verandahs and covered walkways. Three principal buildings facing north east comprise the residence, with various outbuildings to the south and west of these.

The one storeyed building located centrally in the complex, the largest of the buildings, is referred to as the Homestead. This building, which is elevated on timber stumps, is of drop slab timber construction, although the front of the building has been faced with horizontal timber weatherboards. The hipped corrugated iron roof is centrally pierced with a brick chimney shaft, with simple brick corbelling and chimney hood.

Verandahs surround the building although these have been infilled and altered to the south west or rear of the building. Access is provided to the verandah via a centrally located open tread timber stair, which is emphasised with a planted trellis. Four half glazed French doors with transom lights above open from the homestead to the front verandah, and similar doors open on the north western and south eastern sides of the building. The corrugated iron verandah awning is supported on chamfered timber posts, and the soffit is clad with fibrous cement sheeting to the north west of the building.

Internally, the Homestead is divided into three principal rooms, to which the French doors provide access. These rooms are internally clad with fibrous cement sheeting braced with timber strips. Some of the internal walls are covered with calico and hessian lining. A chimney piece, with rudimentary timber mantle, is found in the largest of the rooms on the north west end of the homestead, and another in the adjacent room.

The rear of this building is lined with infilled and open sections of verandah, and also with substantial additions comprising a laundry, kitchen and billiard room. The timber frame additions are externally clad with horizontal weatherboards and internally with fibrous cement sheeting, similar to that found in the front rooms of this building.

To the north west of the homestead, abutting its verandah on this side, is a one-roomed timber building known as the Dining Room. This is thought by the Lawless family to be the oldest building on the site. The building has a hipped corrugated iron roof and verandahs to the north east and north west, the awnings of which are incorporated in the main roof made discernible by a slight change of pitch. The walls of the building are of drop slab construction, and apparent on the underside of the verandah are early shingles and framing. The building is constructed with a system of two roof structures, an external iron clad covering and another timber framed and clad under- roof which meets the top of the external walls, allowing the outer roof to remain at a distance above the walls, allowing a gentler pitch.

Three sets of half glazed French doors open onto the verandah from the interior. The interior walls of the Dining Room are plastered, with stained timber wainscotting to dado rail height. The stained timber beaded board ceiling is coved, following the rake of the under roof previously mentioned.

To the south east of the Homestead and connected to its verandah with a covered walkway, is a smaller timber building known as the Cottage. Encircling it are wide verandahs on all sides, with an infill section of the south east. This building is constructed of vertical slabs of timber housed in recessed timber sections at the top and base of the wall, and the building features a similar double roof system to that previously described. The verandah is supported on chamfered timber posts.

Half glazed French doors give access to the three internal room from the verandah, though some of these have been replaced with single half glazed doors. Internally the Cottage is clad with fibrous cement sheeting, braced with timber strips.

Several outbuildings of various ages surround the three principal buildings, these include a power house to the south-west of the homestead; an early bush house and entrance gates to the north west of the Dining Room; sheds, stores and garages to the north west of the bush house. Many mature trees and plants surround the homestead, these include a hoop pine.

== Heritage listing ==
Booubyjan Homestead was listed on the Queensland Heritage Register on 21 October 1992 having satisfied the following criteria.

The place is important in demonstrating the evolution or pattern of Queensland's history.

As one of the earliest pastoral stations in Queensland, Booubyjan Homestead demonstrates the pattern of land use and settlement in rural areas of the state from the late 1840s and, in particular the development of the Burnett region.

The place demonstrates rare, uncommon or endangered aspects of Queensland's cultural heritage.

Booubyjan provides rare surviving evidence of early timber building construction techniques, including drop slab and vertical slab construction, and shingled roofing.

The place has potential to yield information that will contribute to an understanding of Queensland's history.

Booubyjan Homestead has the potential to yield further information through archaeological research about timber building construction techniques of the mid nineteenth century and of the early pastoral station.

The place is important in demonstrating the principal characteristics of a particular class of cultural places.

The homestead is important in demonstrating the principal characteristics of early Queensland homesteads, constructed as the head station of a large run. The various accretions, dating from the 1860s, demonstrate the growth of the Lawless family.

The place is important because of its aesthetic significance.

The buildings are picturesquely situated in an early garden at the crest of an incline, and have aesthetic significance. Booubyjan Homestead has a number of significant furniture pieces, important to the understanding of the history of the homestead.

The place has a special association with the life or work of a particular person, group or organisation of importance in Queensland's history.

Booubyjan Homestead has special associations with the Lawless family, who originally took up the land in 1847, and have remained on the run to this day. The family included early pioneers of the Burnett region.
