= Ban Ban, Queensland =

Ban Ban
- Suburb
- Interactive map of Ban Ban
- Coordinates: 25.7052°S 151.8288°E
- Country: Australia
- State: Queensland
- LGA: North Burnett Region
- Location: 26.6 km (16.5 mi) SE of Gayndah; 122 km (76 mi) W of Maryborough; 296 km (184 mi) NNW of Brisbane

Government
  - State electorate: Callide
  - Federal division: Flynn

Area
  - Total: 195.2 km^{2} (75.4 sq mi)
- Elevation: 150 m (490 ft)

Population
  - Total: 25 (2021 census)
  - Density: 0.1281/km^{2} (0.332/sq mi)
- Time zone: UTC+10:00 (AEST)
- Postcode: 4625
Suburbs around Ban Ban
Ginoondan	Ginoondan	Coalstoun Lakes
Campbell Creek	Ban Ban	Dundarrah; Stockhaven
Penwhaupell	Booubyjan	Blairmore

Ban Ban is a rural locality in the North Burnett Region, Queensland, Australia. In the 2021 census, Ban Ban had a population of 25 people.

== Geography ==
The locality of Ban Ban completely surrounds the locality of Ban Ban Springs which is situated at the intersection of the Burnett Highway and Isis Highway. As such, both highways also cross Ban Ban as it surrounds the intersection.

Mount Walla (also known as Seven Hills) is in the north-east of the locality (25.6454°S 151.8578°E) and rises to 569 metres (1,867 ft) above sea level. It is part of the Walla Range, which extends north into Ginoondan and Coalstoun Lakes.

== Demographics ==
In the 2016 census, Ban Ban had a population of 34 people.

In the 2021 census, Ban Ban had a population of 25 people.

== Economy ==
There are a number of homesteads in the locality:

- Ban Ban (25.6860°S 151.7867°E)
- Hazelton (25.6979°S 151.8290°E)
- Jenreley (25.6802°S 151.7948°E)

== Education ==
There are no schools in Ban Ban. The nearest government primary schools are Coalstoun Lakes State School in neighbouring Coalstoun Lakes to the north-east and Gayndah State School in Gayndah to the north-west. The nearest government secondary schools are Biggenden State School (to Year 10) in Biggenden to the north-east and Burnett State College (to Year 12) in Gayndah.
