= Ban Ban Springs =

Place in Queensland, Australia

- Town
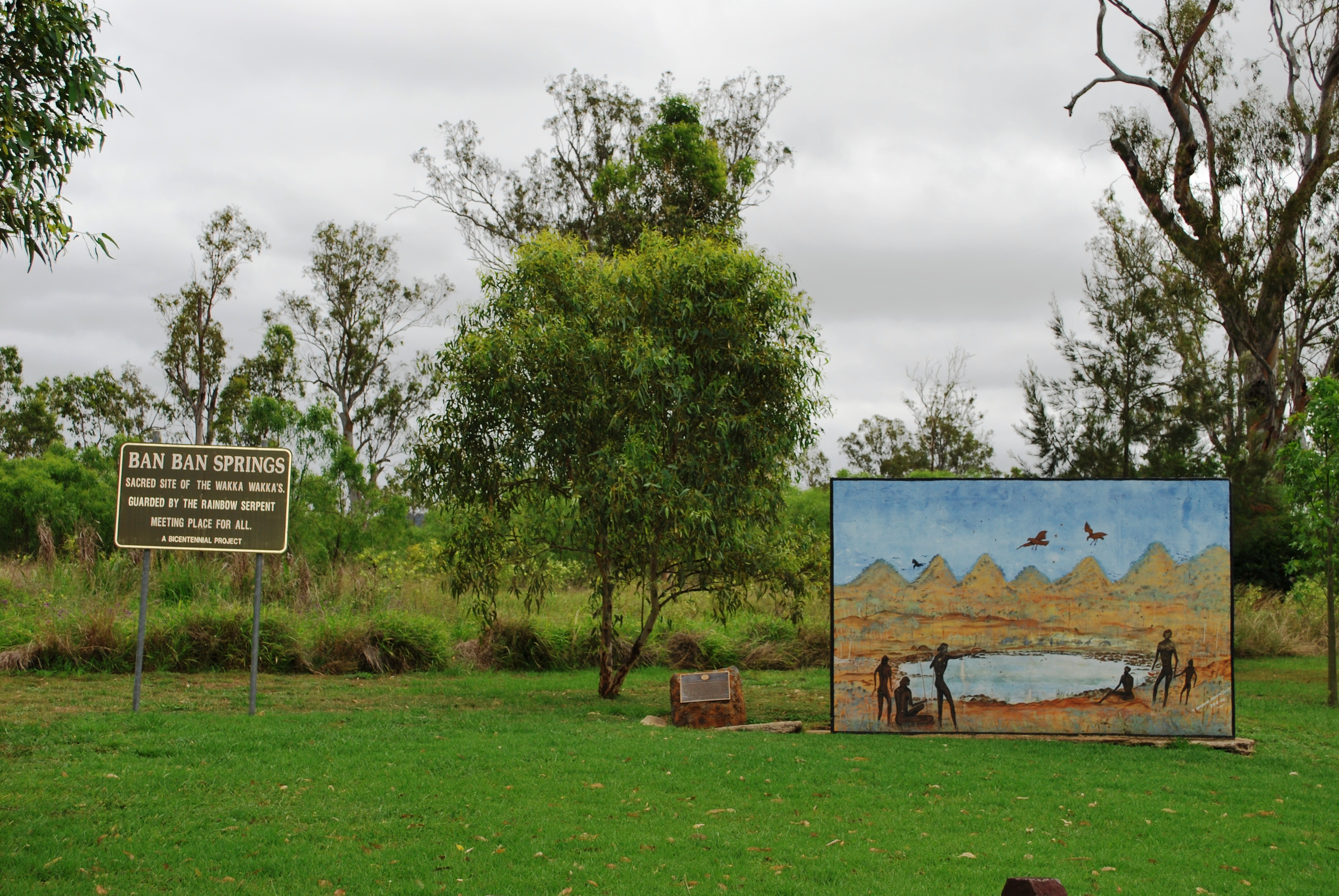

- Interactive map of Ban Ban Springs
- Coordinates: 25.6761°S 151.8205°E
- Country: Australia
- State: Queensland
- LGA: North Burnett Region
- Location: 26.7 km (16.6 mi) SE of Gayndah; 130 km (81 mi) NW of Gympie; 131 km (81 mi) SW of Bundaberg; 305 km (190 mi) NNW of Brisbane

Government
  - State electorate: Callide
  - Federal division: Flynn

Area
  - Total: 20.4 km^{2} (7.9 sq mi)
- Elevation: 130–310 m (430–1,020 ft)

Population
  - Total: 31 (2021 census)
  - Density: 1.520/km^{2} (3.94/sq mi)
- Time zone: UTC+10:00 (AEST)
- Postcode: 4625
Localities around Ban Ban Springs
Ban Ban	Ban Ban	Ban Ban
Ban Ban	Ban Ban Springs	Ban Ban
Ban Ban	Ban Ban	Ban Ban

Ban Ban Springs is a rural locality in the North Burnett Region, Queensland, Australia. In the 2021 census, the locality of Ban Ban Springs had a population of 31 people.

== Geography ==
The locality of Ban Ban Springs is an enclave, surrounded by the larger locality of Ban Ban. Barambah Creek forms part of the southern boundary of the locality.

The Burnett Highway enters the locality from the west and exits to the south. The Isis Highway enters the locality from the east and terminates at its junction with the Burnett Highway in the south of the locality.

On the southern side of the highway junction are the springs from which the community gets its name, being rare springs from which waters flow into the nearby Barambah Creek.

The land use is predominantly grazing on native vegetation with some crop growing.

== History ==
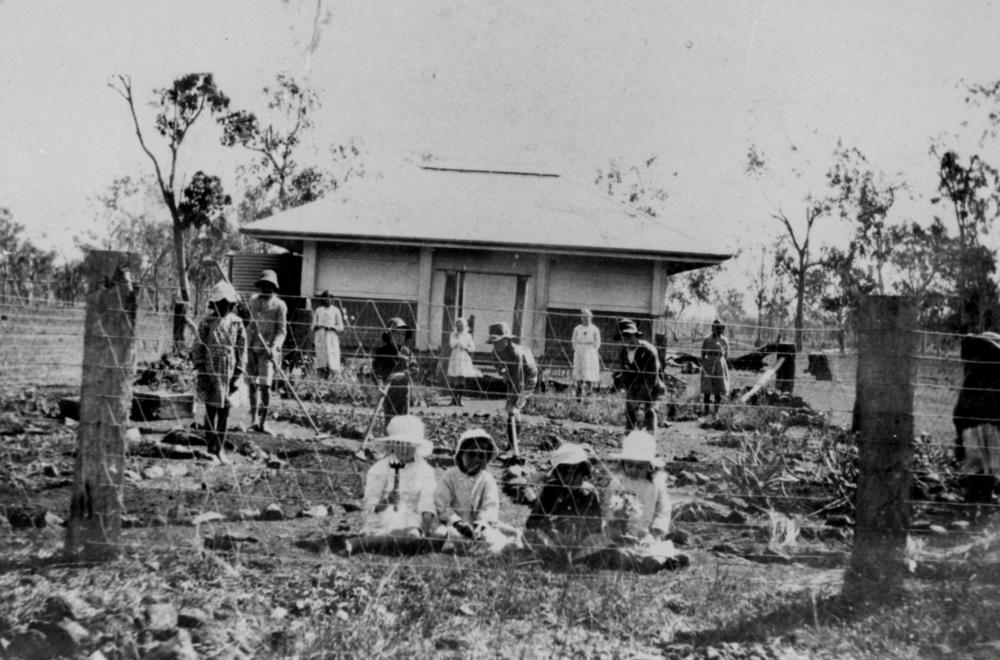
Schoolchildren from Ban Ban Springs State School, tending to the school garden, 1919

The name Ban Ban Springs finds its source in the name originally used by H. Herbert when, in 1846, he first leased the pastoral run encompassing the springs. It is reported Herbert borrowed the words "Ban Ban" (meaning grass) from the local Wakka Wakka and/or Kabi Kabi languages.

Ban Ban Springs State School opened in August 1916. It closed on 24 January 1965. It was on the south-western side of the Burnett Highway (25.68363°S 151.81644°E).

== Demographics ==
In the 2016 census, the locality of Ban Ban Springs had a population of 7 people.

In the 2021 census, the locality of Ban Ban Springs had a population of 31 people.

== Education ==
There are no schools in Ban Ban Springs. The nearest government primary school is Coalstoun Lakes State School in Coalstoun Lakes to the north-east. The nearest government secondary school is Burnett State College in Gayndah to the west.

== Aboriginal cultural heritage ==
The natural springs were the first Queensland Aboriginal cultural heritage to be recognised on the register of the Aboriginal Cultural Heritage Act 2003.

The Wakka Wakka peoples believe that the springs are significant to the Dreaming. This was confirmed by a Queensland Department of Natural Resources and Mines study advised by the Wakka Wakka Jinda. The springs were entered on to the State's Aboriginal Cultural Heritage register for the following reasons:

"Ban Ban [Springs] is a sacred site and has a Dreamtime association with the Rainbow Serpent which is believed to have surfaced there. It spoke to the elders of the tribe telling them the secrets of the sacred waters and how to use it. The Rainbow Serpent also told of talks he had had with the seven sisters and of the wonders he had seen while making the pathways for the sacred water to flow in this area. (This legend is retold on a mural erected at the site by elders Mavis Hawkins, Dennis and Daniel Cobbo of the Wakka Wakka tribe and their people.)"

"It is the birth place of many elders of the Wakka Wakka people with elders of this group living in the town of Gayndah."

"Ban Ban Springs is unique in Indigenous Heritage. It is sacred in men's Business and women's Business for separate and combined reasons."

"Throughout time this area has been guarded by the Rainbow Serpent."

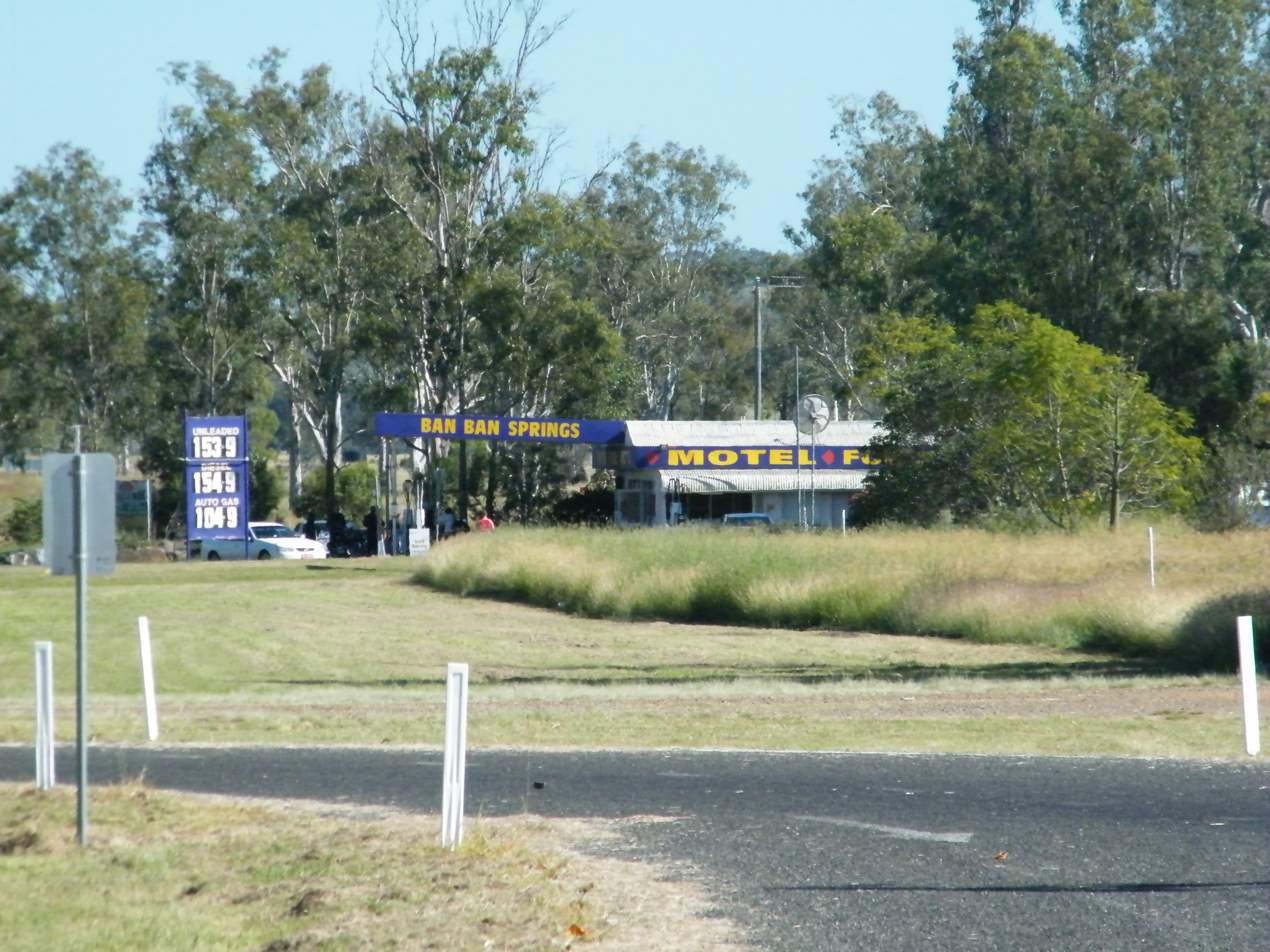
Ban Ban Springs

Unfortunately, in September 2006 the Shire of Gayndah, concerned about noxious weeds (including Chinese elm) and improving visitors' experience of the area, sought to re-vegetate and beautify the place (e.g., planting out up to 30 or more bottlebrushes) by engaging contractors to promptly clear the existing vegetation from in and around the springs, with the following effect:

"Cultural Heritage Destroyed: They've exposed the plant life to the summer heat, moved the rocks around, driven through the springs's pond ... They've bulldozed what Gayndah's Wakka Wakka [people] know as their cultural heritage..."

By 8 May 2007 the Queensland Department of Natural Resources and Water had issued summons under the Aboriginal Cultural Heritage Act 2003 (Qld), threatening prosecution and effectively initiating discussions between the local council and the Wakka Wakka people to somehow rehabilitate the springs, better manage the Aboriginal cultural heritage area, and settle the whole matter by agreement. One year later, the council for the new North Burnett Region expressed formal regret for the harm done and agreed to discuss with the Wakka Wakka.

The springs are usually dry, but local bore irrigation has also reduced the available water.

== See also ==
- List of reduplicated Australian place names
