= Reids Creek =

- Suburb
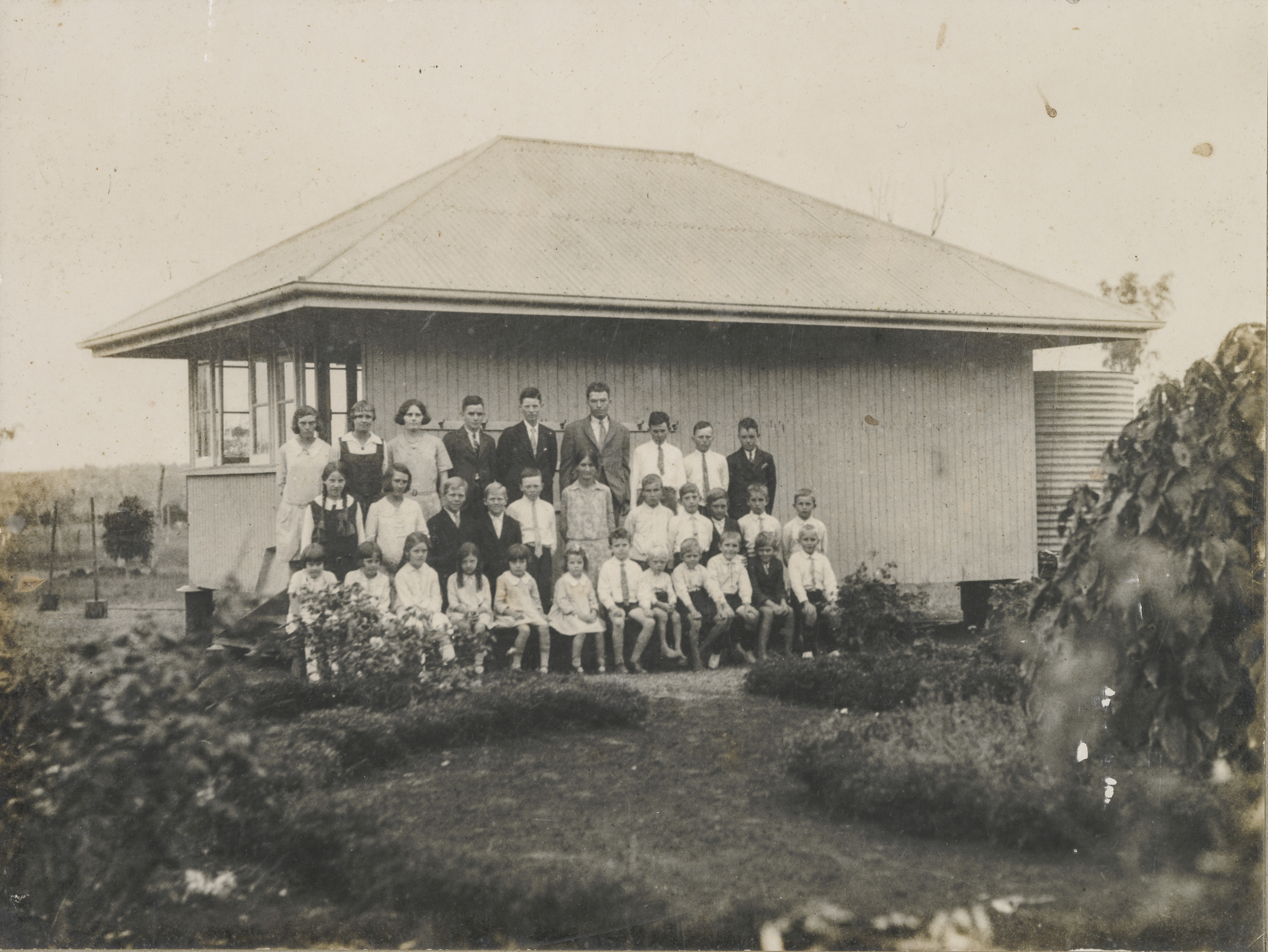
- Teacher Grace Simpson with students, Norwood State School, 1925

- Interactive map of Reids Creek
- Coordinates: 25.5288°S 151.5372°E
- Country: Australia
- State: Queensland
- LGA: North Burnett Region
- Location: 15.4 km (9.6 mi) NNW of Gayndah; 163 km (101 mi) SW of Bundaberg; 338 km (210 mi) NNW of Brisbane

Government
  - State electorate: Callide
  - Federal division: Flynn

Area
  - Total: 99.5 km^{2} (38.4 sq mi)

Population
  - Total: 41 (2021 census)
  - Density: 0.412/km^{2} (1.067/sq mi)
- Time zone: UTC+10:00 (AEST)
- Postcode: 4625
Suburbs around Reids Creek
Branch Creek	Branch Creek	Yenda
Binjour	Reids Creek	Yenda
Humphery	Dirnbir	Ideraway

Reids Creek is a rural locality in the North Burnett Region, Queensland, Australia. In the 2021 census, Reids Creek had a population of 41 people.

== Geography ==
Reid Creek enters the locality from the north and flows through to become the south-east boundary. Binjour Range forms the western boundary. The Burnett Highway passes through from the south-east to the west.

== History ==
Reid's Creek Upper Provisional School opened in 1903. On 1 January 1909, it became Reid's Creek Upper State School. It had a closure between 1905 and 1907 due to low student numbers. It closed permanently in 1922. It was in a pocket of the creek (approx 25.5168°S 151.5465°E).

Reid's Creek State School opened in 1909 and closed in 1963. It was on the Burnett Highway (25.5388°S 151.5455°E).

Norwood State School opened in 1920 and closed in 1952. It was on Reids Creek Road near the intersection with present-day Guyatts Road (25.4923°S 151.5156°E).

== Demographics ==
In the 2016 census, Reids Creek had a population of 54 people.

In the 2021 census, Reids Creek had a population of 41 people.

== Education ==
There are no schools in Reids Creek. The nearest government primary schools are Binjour Plateau State School in neighbouring Binjour to the west and Gayndah State School in Gayndah to the south-east. The nearest government secondary school is Burnett State College in Gayndah to the south-east.
