= Bon Accord, Queensland =

Bon Accord
- Suburb
- Interactive map of Bon Accord
- Coordinates: 25.5649°S 151.6719°E
- Country: Australia
- State: Queensland
- LGA: North Burnett Region
- Location: 9.5 km (5.9 mi) NW of Gayndah; 149 km (93 mi) W of Maryborough; 154 km (96 mi) W of Hervey Bay; 323 km (201 mi) NNW of Brisbane

Government
  - State electorate: Callide
  - Federal division: Flynn

Area
  - Total: 11.1 km^{2} (4.3 sq mi)

Population
  - Total: 29 (2021 census)
  - Density: 2.61/km^{2} (6.77/sq mi)
- Time zone: UTC+10:00 (AEST)
- Postcode: 4625
Suburbs around Bon Accord
Mount Lawless	Wetheron	Wetheron
Ideraway	Bon Accord	Wetheron
Gayndah	Gayndah	Gayndah

Bon Accord is a rural locality in the North Burnett Region, Queensland, Australia. In the 2021 census, Bon Accord had a population of 29 people.

== Geography ==
The locality is bounded to the north-west and west by the Burnett River.

The Bon Accord Wetheron Road enters the locality from the south (Gayndah) and exits to the north (Wetherton).

The predominant land use is grazing on native vegetation with some crop growing near the Burnett River and its tributary Barambah Creek.

== History ==
Bon Accord Provisional School opened about September 1901. It became Bon Accord State School on 1 January 1909. Due to low attendances, it closed about May 1922. It was located on the eastern bank of Barambah Creek immediately north of the Bon Accord Wetheron Road (approx 25.58122°S 151.66291°E).

== Demographics ==
In the 2016 census, Bon Accord had a population of 19 people.

In the 2021 census, Bon Accord had a population of 29 people.

== Education ==
There are no schools in Bon Accord. The nearest government primary school is Gayndah State School in neighbouring Gayndah to the south-west. The nearest government secondary school is Burnett State College, also in Gayndah to the south-west.
