= Wetheron, Queensland =

Wetheron
- Town
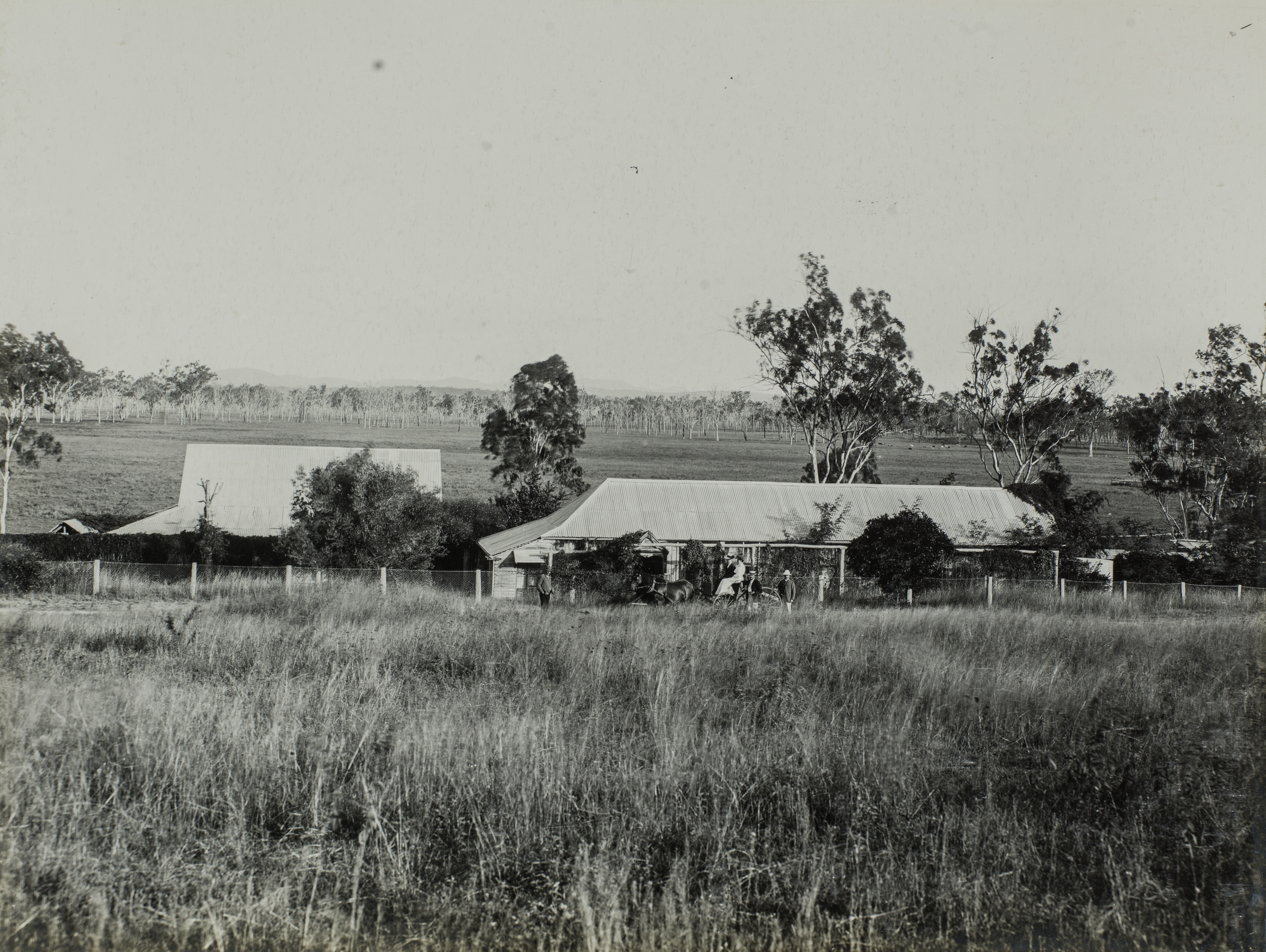
- Wetheron Cattle Station, circa 1922

- Interactive map of Wetheron
- Coordinates: 25.5458°S 151.7186°E
- Country: Australia
- State: Queensland
- LGA: North Burnett Region
- Location: 27.2 km (16.9 mi) NNE of Gayndah; 133 km (83 mi) W of Maryborough; 163 km (101 mi) NW of Gympie; 329 km (204 mi) NNW of Brisbane

Government
  - State electorate: Callide
  - Federal division: Flynn

Area
  - Total: 125.8 km^{2} (48.6 sq mi)

Population
  - Total: 40 (2021 census)
  - Density: 0.32/km^{2} (0.82/sq mi)
- Time zone: UTC+10:00 (AEST)
- Postcode: 4625
Localities around Wetheron
Yenda	Mingo	Mount Steadman
Mount Lawless	Wetheron	Gooroolba
Bon Accord; Gayndah	Ginoondan	Byrnestown

Wetheron is a rural town and locality in the North Burnett Region, Queensland, Australia. In the 2021 census, the locality of Wetheron had a population of 40 people.

== Geography ==
The Burnett River forms the western and north-western boundary of the locality, entering the locality from the south-west (Mount Lawless / Bon Accord) and exiting to the north (Yenda / Mingo).

The Mungar Junction to Monto Branch Railway passed through Wetheron. The town was served by the now-abandoned Wetheron railway station (25.5443°S 151.7186°E).

A report by R. W. Winks of the Department of Agriculture, Brisbane, surveying for the proposed Degilbo to Gayndah railway line extension, dated 10 November 1897 stated:- "The first really good piece of country of any extent begins some little distance from the coach stage at Wetheron, Two Mile, extending beyond the head station and running thence in a south-westerly direction to Oakey Creek. This belt, which takes in the whole of what was the Byrnestown and part of the Resolute and Bon Accord Groups, about 8 miles (13 km) in length, and varying in breadth from 3 to 4 miles, is on the whole good land. It is principally composed of fine, black and chocolate soil ridges, even in contour, and in many places lightly timbered with broad-leafed ironbark and a kind of bloodwood. In some parts there is scarcely any timber, from which fact a portion of this zone is known locally as the Wetheron Clear Lands. Want of water is the chief drawback, but from some wells I saw on what was once group property, it would appear that good water can be obtained by comparatively shallow sinking. The average depth of the wells seemed about 40 feet (12 m)."

The land use is predominantly grazing on native vegetation with a small amount of crop growing.

== History ==
European settlement in the Wetheron area began in 1845, when William Humphreys and Henry Arthur Herbert took up a run of crown land on the south bank of the Burnett River. The estimated 24,000 acres (9,700 ha) was about 12 miles (19 km) from Gayndah and 70 miles (110 km) from Maryborough and was known as Wetheron Head Station. This was transferred to William Humphreys solely in 1851, along with the Ginoondam run. Chinese labour was employed at Wetheron during Humphreys tenure.

When Humphreys advertised the Wetheron runs for sale in 1857 the head station was described as consisting "of a comfortable verandah house, shingled, and containing 4 rooms and pantry, a kitchen, store, and meat store, overseer's house, shingled; woolshed, fitted with yards, shearer's house, shingled; two labourer's huts; a good two rail horse paddock; small cultivation paddock (3 rail); garden, stockyard, milking yard, pigsties, etc. There are seven out stations, with substantial huts, and yards or hurdles at each of them." The run consisted of Wetheron Head Station, Ginoondam, Wateranga and Gooroolballam stations.

The partnership of Hon. Berkeley Basil Moreton and Osmond de Preaux Brock acquired the Station. Berkeley Moreton's brother Seymour Moreton replaced Brock in 1861.

The co-operative groups of Bon Accord, Byrnestown and Resolute settled on sites on a Wetheron run resumption in 1894.

The Wetheron Run had been reduced to 15,360 acres (6,220 ha) by 1901.

In 1905, more parts of Wetheron were being opened up as agricultural farms and unconditional selections, and in 1908 the leasehold expired.

The Mungar Junction to Monto Branch Railway was opened to the town of Wetheron on 21 December 1905. At that time, the town consisted of a newly built hotel, kept by Mr. A. A. Morgan, and a fruit shop and general store. The Mungar Junction to Monto railway line opened between Wetheron to Gayndah on 16 December 1907.

Wetheron State School opened on 24 January 1916. It closed on 31 December 1963. It was on John Street (25.54631°S 151.71999°E).

In November 1925, the Anglican Archdiocese of Brisbane provided a loan of £150 to establish a church in Wetheron. Mrs Helen Gray donated a quarter-acre of land and a parish hall was erected by George James Bellert. The hall was officially opened on 5 May 1926. St John's Anglican Church was dedicated on 11 December 1927 by Venerable William Powning Glover, Archdeacon of Toowoomba. It is now closed.

Sefton Provisional School opened in 1925 and closed in 1926.

In 2012, the railway line was officially closed.

== Demographics ==
In the 2016 census, the locality of Wetheron had a population of 46 people.

In the 2021 census, the locality of Wetheron had a population of 40 people.

== Education ==
There are no schools in Wetheron. The nearest government primary schools are Gayndah State School in neighbouring Gayndah to the south-west and Coalstoun Lakes State School in Coalstoun Lakes to the south-east. The nearest government secondary school is Burnett State College in Gayndah.
