= Isis Highway =

Highway in Queensland, Australia

Isis Highway Queensland
- Isis Highway (green and black)

General information
- Type: Highway
- Length: 137 km (85 mi)
- Route number(s): State Route 3; (Bundaberg North – Childers); State Route 52; (Childers – Ban Ban Springs)

Major junctions
- NE end: Bundaberg–Gin Gin Road (Mount Perry Road), Bundaberg North, Queensland
- Bruce Highway
- SW end: Burnett Highway, Ban Ban Springs, Queensland

Location(s)
- Major settlements: Childers, Biggenden

Highway system
- Highways in Australia; National Highway • Freeways in Australia; Highways in Queensland

The Isis Highway (not to be confused with ISIS), is a state highway in southern Queensland, Australia. The highway is relatively short, and runs for 137 kilometres (85 mi) in a north-east / south-west direction between Bundaberg North and the Burnett Highway at Ban Ban Springs. The Isis Highway links the sugar producing Bundaberg and Fraser Coast regions with the cattle farming districts of the North Burnett.

The highway takes its name from the Isis River, which flows between Childers and Burrum Heads. The highway also passes through a significant amount of the former Isis Shire local government area, of which Childers was the administrative centre.

The Isis Highway is signed as State Route 3 between Bundaberg and Childers, and State Route 52 between Childers and Ban Ban Springs. The section between Bundaberg and Childers is a state-controlled regional road (number 19A) while that between Childers and Ban Ban Springs is a state-controlled strategic road (numbers 19B and 19C).

== Route description ==
The road commences at a roundabout in Bundaberg North as State Route 3 and runs south as Hinkler Avenue, crossing the Burnett River on the Don Tallon Bridge. Most of this section is one lane in each direction. After 2.0 kilometres (1.2 mi) it passes through a five-way intersection, crossing Bourbong Street and turning south-west on Takalvan Street. This four lane road continues for a further 3.3 kilometres (2.1 mi) to the Airport Drive / Kendalls Road exit, where it becomes Childers Road, reverting to two lanes.

Childers Road passes to the west of Bundaberg Airport and through the outer suburbs of Kensington and Branyan before reaching the village of South Bingera. From there to Apple Tree Creek it passes through a mixture of farm land and forest, with sugar cane and other crops intermixed. Childers Road is 41.8 kilometres (26.0 mi) in length, making a cumulative distance to the Bruce Highway at Apple Tree Creek of 47.1 kilometres (29.3 mi).

From Apple Tree Creek the Isis Highway runs south-east concurrent with the Bruce Highway for 6.4 kilometres (4.0 mi) to the western outskirts of the town of Childers, where it turns south on Broadhurst Street as State Route 52. The street name is dropped as the road leaves the town, and the two lane road runs south-west and south through farm land and forest for 45.8 kilometres (28.5 mi) to Biggenden. From Biggenden a further 37.7 kilometres (23.4 mi) generally south-west through similar country leads to the Burnett Highway at Ban Ban Springs, making a total cumulative distance of 137.0 kilometres (85.1 mi).

== Roads of Strategic Importance upgrade ==
The Roads of Strategic Importance initiative, last updated in March 2022, includes the following project for the Isis Highway.

=== Overtaking lanes ===
A project to construct overtaking lanes on the Isis Highway, at an estimated cost of $5 million, was completed in mid-2021.

== Other upgrades ==
A project to improve safety in various locations, at a cost of $41.8 million, was expected to be completed in 2024.

== Towns along the Isis Highway ==
- Bundaberg
- Cordalba
- Childers
- Dallarnil
- Degilbo
- Biggenden
- Coalstoun Lakes

== Major intersections ==
LGA	Location	km	mi	Destinations	Notes
Bundaberg	Bundaberg North	0	0.0	Bundaberg–Gin Gin Road (Mount Perry Road) (State Route 3) – west – Gin Gin; Bundaberg–Gin Gin Road (Mount Perry Road) – east – Bundaberg CBD; Fairymead Road – north – Fairymead	Roundabout intersection. Northern end of Isis Highway (State Route 3). State Route 3 continues west to Gin Gin.
Burnett River		1.1– 1.7	0.68– 1.1	Don Tallon Bridge	
Bundaberg	Bundaberg West	2.0	1.2	Bundaberg–Bargara Road (Bourbong Street) – east – Bundaberg CBD; Bourbong Street – west – Millbank; Mulgrave Street – south – Bundaberg West	Five-way intersection. Isis Highway continues south–west as Takalvan Street.
Bundaberg	Apple Tree Creek	47.1	29.3	Bruce Highway (Queensland Highway A1) – north–west – Gin Gin. / south–east – Childers	Northern concurrency terminus with Bruce Highway
Wide Bay-Burnett	Childers	53.5	33.2	Bruce Highway (Queensland Highway A1) – south–east – Howard	Southern concurrency terminus with Bruce Highway.
Wide Bay-Burnett	Childers	53.5	33.2	Bruce Highway (Queensland Highway A1) – south–east – Howard	Isis Highway continues south as State Route 52.
North Burnett	Biggenden	99.3	61.7	Maryborough Biggenden Road (State Route 86) – south–east – Brooweena	
North Burnett	Ban Ban Springs	137	85	Burnett Highway (State Route A3) – north – Gayndah / south – Goomeri	
1.000 mi = 1.609 km; 1.000 km = 0.621 mi: Concurrency terminus; Route transition

== Gallery ==
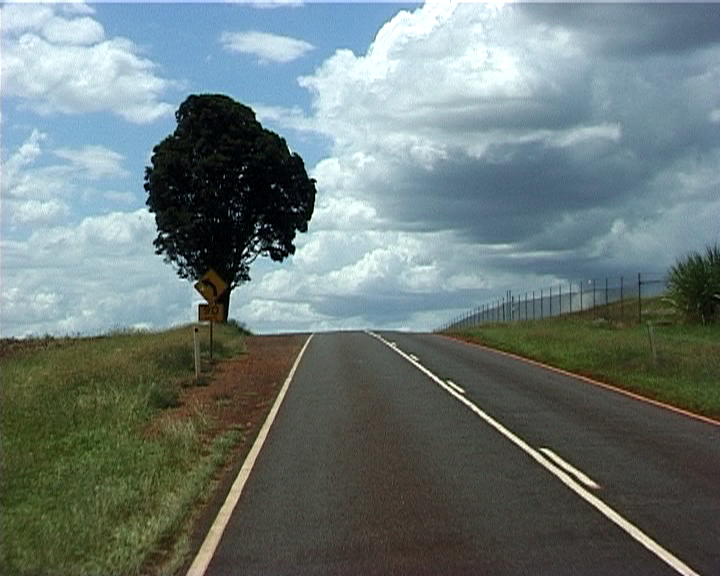
Isis Highway between Apple Tree Creek and Bundaberg

== See also ==
- Highways in Australia
- List of highways in Queensland
- List of numbered roads in Queensland
