= Coalstoun Lakes, Queensland =

Coalstoun Lakes
- Town
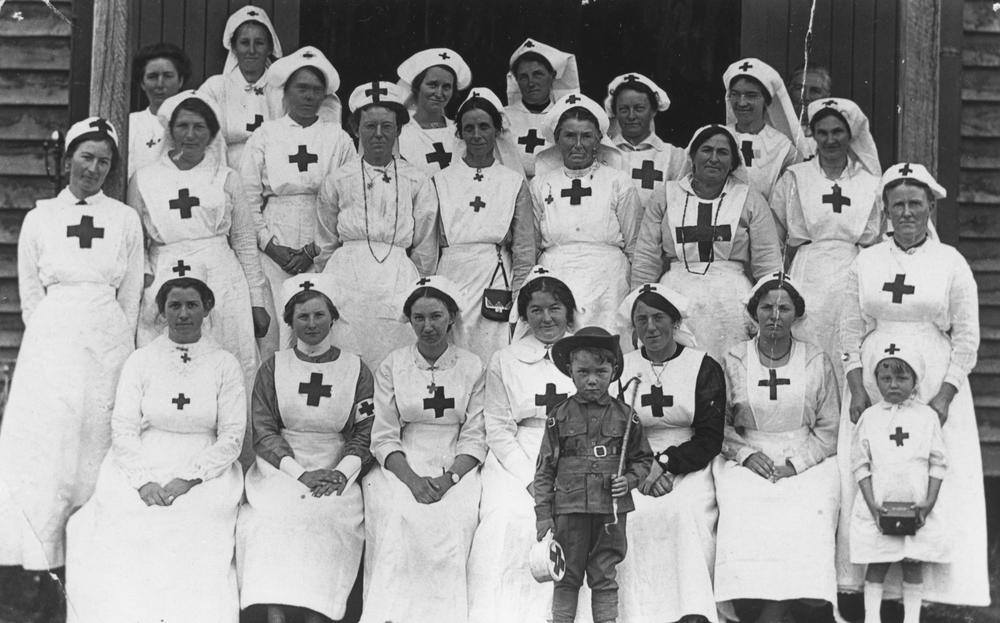
- Red Cross workers on Red Cross Day, 19 July 1918

- Interactive map of Coalstoun Lakes
- Coordinates: 25.6133°S 151.89°E
- Country: Australia
- State: Queensland
- LGA: North Burnett Region
- Location: 24.9 km (15.5 mi) SW of Biggenden; 43.5 km (27.0 mi) E of Gayndah; 119 km (74 mi) SW of Bundaberg; 317 km (197 mi) NNW of Brisbane

Government
  - State electorate: Callide
  - Federal division: Flynn

Area
  - Total: 51.9 km^{2} (20.0 sq mi)

Population
  - Total: 99 (2021 census)
  - Density: 1.908/km^{2} (4.940/sq mi)
- Time zone: UTC+10:00 (AEST)
- Postcode: 4621
Localities around Coalstoun Lakes
Wilson Valley	Didcot	Biggenden
Ginoondan	Coalstoun Lakes	Biggenden
Ban Ban	Ban Ban	Dundarrah

Coalstoun Lakes is a rural town and locality in the North Burnett Region, Queensland, Australia. In the 2021 census, the locality of Coalstoun Lakes had a population of 99 people.

== Geography ==
The Isis Highway passes through the locality from north-east to south, also passing through the town (where it is called Main Street). The Coalstoun Lakes National Park is in the north-east of the locality.

== History ==
The lakes (from which the district takes its name) were named by local pioneer, Nugent Wade Brown, in 1894. There are various theories as to the origin of the name.

- One is that Coalstoun is the corruption of an Aboriginal word Goanalganai.
- Another theory is that the name 'Coalstoun' is a corruption of the word 'Colstoun'. Nugent Wade Brown's father, John Brown (1787–1860), emigrated to the Colony of New South Wales and established a property named Colstoun near what is now Gresford in the Hunter Valley in 1838.
- Colstoun was the ancestral home of the Brown family in Scotland. Colstoun is located south of Edinburgh and remains in the Brown family. According to Queensland Department of National Parks, Sport and Racing "The lakes were named after Coalstoun in Scotland by Wade Brun, manager of nearby Ban Ban Station." There is no doubt that Nugent Wade Brown and Wade Brun were the same person. His wife, Margaret Campbell-Antill, was an aunt of Major-General John Macquarie Antill CB CMG.

Coalstoun Lakes Cemetery is believed to be older than the town itself, as its earliest surviving inscription on a grave is dated 1899.

Coalstoun Lakes State School opened on 25 July 1910.

Brigalow Creek State School opened on 3 December 1913 and closed in 1924.

Coalstoun Lakes Community Hall was originally built in 1916. After World War I, it was extended and renamed the Coalstoun Lakes Memorial Hall to commemorate those who served and died in the war.

Mount Harvey State School opened on 24 January 1921 and closed on 31 October 1948.

Coalstoun Lakes Post Office opened on 1 July 1927 (a receiving office had been open from 1910) and closed in 1976.

On 31 July 1932 Archbishop James Duhig opened the Catholic church in Coalstoun Lakes.

St Thomas' Anglican Church was dedicated on 30 December 1934 by Bishop Horace Henry Dixon.

== Demographics ==
In the 2011 census, the locality of Coalstoun Lakes had a population of 423 people.

In the 2016 census, the locality of Coalstoun Lakes had a population of 114 people.

In the 2021 census, the locality of Coalstoun Lakes had a population of 99 people.

== Heritage listings ==
Coalstoun Lakes has a number of heritage-listed sites, including:

- corner of Glenview Street and Cemetery Road: Coalstoun Lakes Cemetery
- corner of Isis Highway and Glenview Street: Coalstoun Lakes Memorial Hall

== Education ==
Coalstoun Lakes State School is a government primary (Prep–6) school for boys and girls at 3 Main Street (25.6121°S 151.8901°E). In 2018, the school had an enrolment of 10 students with 2 teachers (1 full-time equivalent) and 5 non-teaching staff (2 full-time equivalent).

There is no secondary school in Coalstoun Lakes. The nearest government secondary schools are Biggenden State School (to Year 10) in neighbouring Biggenden to the north-east and Burnett State College (to Year 12) in Gayndah to the west.

== Facilities ==
Coalstoun Lakes Memorial Hall is at 34 Main Street (25.6155°S 151.8896°E). The Coalstoun Lakes Rural Fire Brigade operates from the shed at the rear of the hall access from Glenview Street.

St Thomas' Community Church is at 11 Main Street (25.61377°S 151.89031°E); it is a former Anglican Church.

Coalstoun Lakes Cemetery is at the end of Coalstoun Lakes Cemetery Road (25.6148°S 151.8867°E).
