= Gayndah Racecourse =

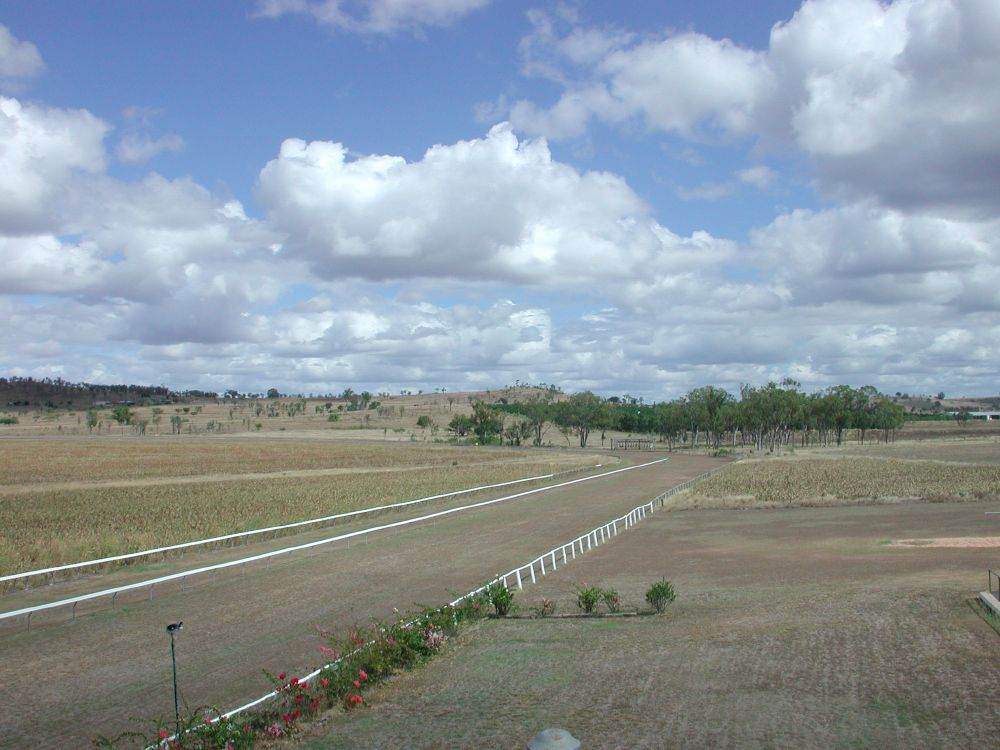
- Gayndah Racecourse

- Location within Queensland Location within Australia
- 25.6282°S 151.5924°E
- Location: Fisher Avenue, Gayndah, North Burnett Region, Queensland, Australia

History
- Design period: 1840s–1860s (mid-19th century)
- Built: c. 1855

Queensland Heritage Register
- Official name: Gayndah Racecourse, Gayndah Race Track
- Type: state heritage (built)
- Designated: 12 September 2005
- Reference no.: 602514
- Significant period: c. 1855 (fabric); 1868 (historical); 1855–ongoing (social)
- Significant components: track – horse racing

Gayndah Racecourse is a heritage-listed racecourse at Fisher Avenue, Gayndah, North Burnett Region, Queensland, Australia. It was built c. 1855. It is also known as Gayndah Race Track. It was added to the Queensland Heritage Register on 12 September 2005.

== History ==
The Gayndah Racecourse was established in the mid 1850s to replace a track established nearby in 1852. The first Queensland Derby race was held there in 1868 and the course is still in regular use for horse racing.

Europeans in search of grazing land for sheep first explored the Burnett in the early 1840s and the town of Gayndah was founded in 1849 to serve pastoral stations in the district. The site of the town was chosen and named by Maurice O'Connell, then Land Commissioner for the area. Gayndah developed as an administrative centre, having a court house and police station in the 1850s, soon followed a school, post office and bank. It was at one time considered to be a contender for the capital of Queensland when Separation from New South Wales was contemplated. By the late 19th century, cattle had replaced sheep on the surrounding pastoral properties and citrus orchards had been successfully established. From the turn of the century, dairying also played a part in the providing an economic basis for the development of the area.

In 1852, the year that Gayndah was officially gazetted as a town, a public meeting was held at the Burnett Arms in Gayndah to organise the setting up of a track for horse racing. £100 was collected and a suitable area at the edge of town selected. The winning post was set up midway between two hotels, the Burnett Arms and the Corinth Arms, which were about two and a half miles apart. The first race was held on 30 June 1852. It was a three-day event with racing on the first and third days for prizes in excess of £100. This track was used for a few years before the current and more level site nearby replaced it, probably in 1855 or 1856.

A meeting was held at the Royal Hotel, Gayndah in July 1858 to mount a petition to Sir William Denison, Governor of New South Wales (the separation of Queensland did not occur until 1859), to grant the Crown Land on which the track was situated for use as a racecourse on the grounds that the town had not been granted a recreation reserve and there was no other course closer than Ipswich, 230 miles (370 km) away. There were 65 signatories to the petition, but it did not have an easy passage.

As the land on which the track was located was in an area intended to serve as future suburban allotments, the government was at first inclined to refuse the request and on 6 May 1859 asked for guidance from the Surveyor General's office. A report of 25 August 1859 recommended that as town development was in fact taking place away from this area, a reserve of between 100 and 120 acres (40 and 49 ha) should be granted for a racecourse. The request was approved on 11 June 1859, but Queensland was separated from New South Wales on 10 December 1859 as a self-governing colony. The racecourse reserve, of 180 acres (73 ha), was surveyed in March 1862 and the land grant signed by Sir George Bowen, the first Governor of Queensland, on 26 March 1863 at a quit rent of one farthing "as a racecourse and for no other purpose". Trustees were Berkely Basil Moreton, Alpin Grant Cameron, Robert Wilkin Smith, Gilbert William Eliott and Francis Glynn Connolly.

Horses had arrived in Australia with the First Fleet in 1788 and the first organised horse race was run at Hyde Park in 1810. In 1842 the first racing club, the Australian Jockey Club, was formed. In Queensland, horse racing was one of the earliest organised sports following the opening of the Moreton Bay District for free settlement. The first race meeting was held at Coopers Plains on 17 July 1843 and there was a racecourse at New Farm in Brisbane by May 1846. In 1848 the towns of Warwick, Ipswich and Drayton organised race meetings. Government authorities took racing seriously as more than a sport as horses were then the main means of transport for economic, military and recreational purposes and racing was thought to help improve breeding.

In 1861, the Gayndah Race Club decided to change its name to the Queensland Jockey Club; at the time, racing at Brisbane was under the auspices of the Brisbane Race Club and at Ipswich as the North Australia Race Club. Eagle Farm Racecourse opened in Brisbane in 1863, replacing the 1846 New Farm track, and the Queensland Turf Club was formed. The Gayndah racecourse by this time had booths for hire where publicans and confectioners supplied refreshments.

Gayndah hosted the first Queensland Derby held in Queensland. This is a classic race for three-year-olds run over one and a half miles and was first held in 1780 at Epsom in England, being named for the 12th Earl of Derby. In Australia the first Derby was run in 1861 at Randwick in Sydney and in 1868 one was held at Gayndah. Bookmakers came up from Melbourne for the event. The race was won by the house Hermit, with owner William Parry-Okeden receiving the prize of 20 sovereigns. The Derby was held at Gayndah for two more years until falling into abeyance and being revived in 1872 in Brisbane.

The race meetings were gala events attended by people from the surrounding district and from as far afield as Port Curtis, Ipswich and Nanango. Horses came from as far away as Sydney to compete and Gayndah considered itself the racing centre of Queensland, even after the Derby had moved to Brisbane. A Brisbane Cup was held in 1866 and a Gayndah Cup in 1867 quickly followed by Cup events at Gympie, Maryborough, Rockhampton, Townsville, Charters Towers, Toowoomba, Warwick and Dalby.

In spite of the early establishment of the Queensland Turf Club and the development of horse racing in regional centres during the 1860s and 1870s, it did not become popular in Queensland on a large scale until the 1880s, when there was a boom in racing and many new clubs were formed and race meetings held. A new code of rules was adopted in 1885 based on those of the English Jockey Club and a system of registration of all clubs under the Queensland Turf Club rules was instituted. The Queensland Racing Calendar was first published in 1886 and in 1890 all clubs agreed to empower the Queensland Turf Club to allot dates for meetings to prevent clashes.

In 1914 the racecourse land was gazetted as a reserve under Trustees led by the Mayor of Gayndah and on 29 October 1937 a special meeting was held by the Council to formulate by-laws. These were gazetted on 3 March 1938 under the provisions of the Local Government Land Act 1936. The Gayndah Shire Council are still trustees for the racecourse.

New service buildings were constructed at the racecourse in the 1980s. The track itself has been in use as a racecourse since its inception and the Gayndah Jockey Club still hosts regular racing meetings there.

A statue of a horse and rider in Capper Street commemorates the running of the first Queensland Derby.

== Description ==
The Gayndah Racecourse occupies a large level area on the southeast side of the town. It is bounded on three sides by roads and a large block of open land adjoins it to the south.

Two gates access the racecourse grounds. One comprises timber posts supporting a tubular metal structure framing the letters G.J.C. for Gayndah Jockey Club, the other is a timber gate constructed to commemorate the Centenary of Federation and also the founding in Gayndah of Queensland's first Jockey Club in 1861 and the first Queensland Derby in 1868.

The track itself occupies most of the space and is enclosed on either side by a fence of metal posts with a white painted top rail. It is grassed and roughly oval in shape, being 17,097 metres (56,093 ft) in circumference with a training track on the inside. Crops are currently grown in the centre of the course.

A mechanical starting stall is used to start each race and the straight with the winning post is set at the northwest corner of the track overlooked by a metal tower. Bougainvilleas are planted along the edge of the track in this area and to the north of the tower is a set of parallel rails coloured red, yellow and blue for the winning horses. To the rear of the paddock area and extending southwest are two parallel sets of modern buildings. The facilities closest to the track include a clubhouse and betting ring, bars, a ladies' room and a tearoom and kitchen. A second set of buildings to the northwest comprises jockeys' rooms, offices and the Totalisator office with a toilet block at the northern end. There are also 60 day stalls for horses and a swabbing stall with a washing down bay at the end of the stalls. The saddling enclosure is between the jockeys' room and the track.

All these buildings currently serving the course were constructed towards the end of the 20th century and have no heritage significance.

== Heritage listing ==
Gayndah Racecourse was listed on the Queensland Heritage Register on 12 September 2005 having satisfied the following criteria.

The place is important in demonstrating the evolution or pattern of Queensland's history.

As a horseracing track, established in the 1850s during the first phase of free European settlement in Queensland, the Gayndah Racecourse is evidence for the importance and early development of the sport. Horse races were amongst the first organised sporting events in Australia and served as both a recreation and for the furtherance of horse breeding. This was important in an era when horses were used for transport, industry and warfare as well as for recreation. The first Derby held in Queensland was held on this track in 1868. The establishment of a racecourse is part of the pattern of Gayndah's development as an early town, established in 1849 as a centre for the Burnett District.

The place demonstrates rare, uncommon or endangered aspects of Queensland's cultural heritage.

The Gayndah Racecourse is uncommon as a mid nineteenth century horse racing track in Queensland and may have been in longer continuous regular use as a race track than any other in Queensland.

The place has a strong or special association with a particular community or cultural group for social, cultural or spiritual reasons.

The Gayndah Racecourse is important for its social value to Jockey Club members, trainers, owners and jockeys and with generations of racegoers from all walks of life, both in the surrounding area and from further afield.
