= Gayndah Shire Hall =

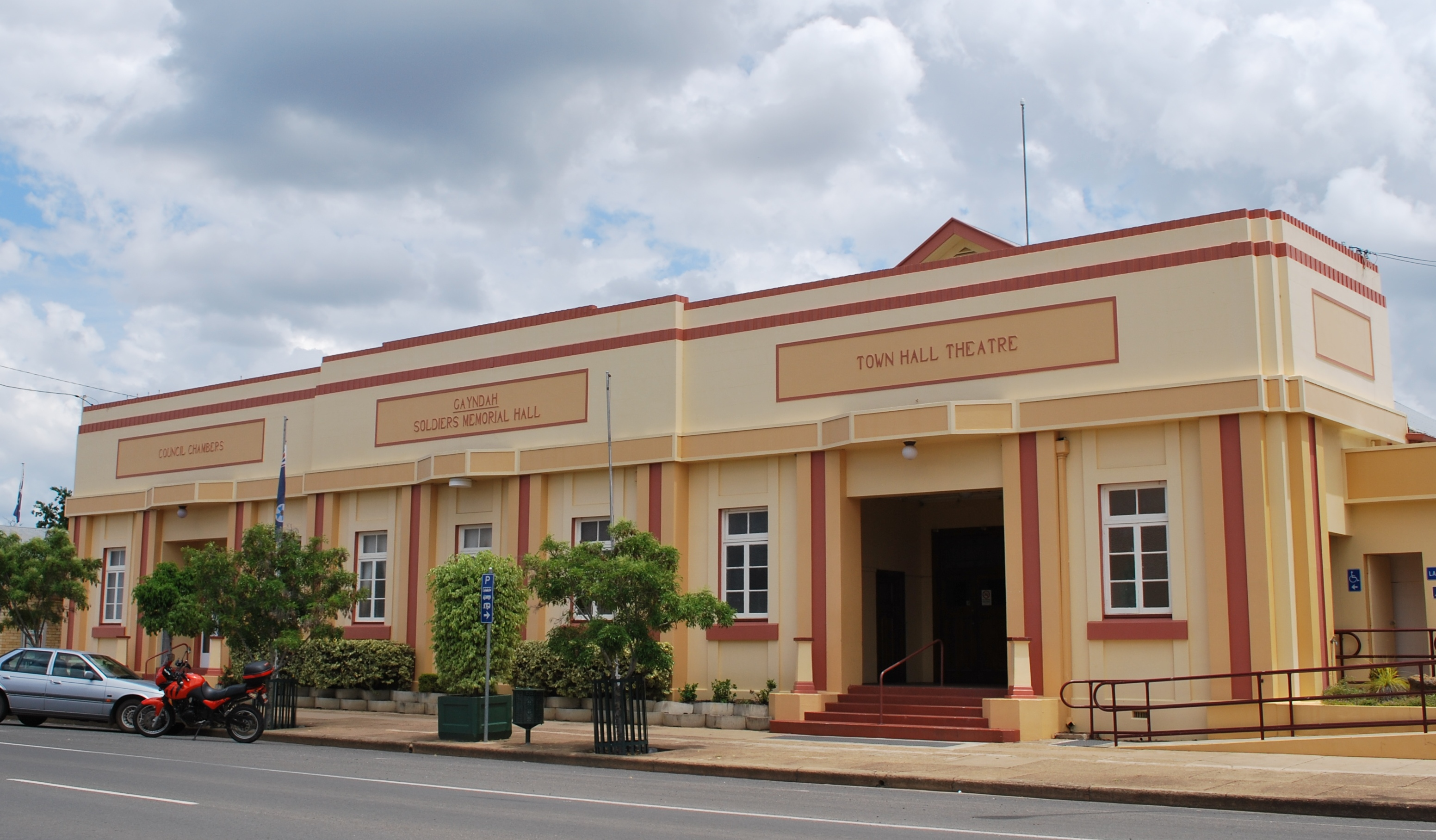
- Gayndah Shire Hall, 2008

- Location within Queensland Location within Australia
- 25.6257°S 151.6105°E
- Location: 32–34 Capper Street, Gayndah, North Burnett Region, Queensland, Australia

History
- Design period: 1919–1930s (interwar period)
- Built: 1934–1935

Site notes
- Architect: Hall & Phillips

Queensland Heritage Register
- Official name: Gayndah Shire Hall, Gayndah Soldiers' Memorial Hall, Gayndah Town Hall, Gayndah and District Soldiers Memorial Hall and Council Chambers
- Type: state heritage (built)
- Designated: 28 September 2001
- Reference no.: 602124
- Significant period: 1930s, 1960s, 1990s (historical); 1930s (fabric); 1935–ongoing (social)
- Significant components: theatre – picture theatre/cinema, furniture/fittings, hall, council chamber/meeting room, views to, supper room, office/s

Gayndah Shire Hall is a heritage-listed town hall at 32–34 Capper Street, Gayndah, North Burnett Region, Queensland, Australia. It was designed by Hall & Phillips and built from 1934 to 1935. It is also known as Gayndah Soldiers' Memorial Hall, Gayndah Town Hall, and Gayndah and District Soldiers Memorial Hall and Council Chambers. It was added to the Queensland Heritage Register on 28 September 2001.

== History ==
The Gayndah Soldier's Memorial Hall and Council Chambers was constructed in 1935 on the corner of Capper and Pineapple Streets by the Gayndah Town Council. The building was designed by prominent Brisbane architects, Hall and Phillips, and is one of a number of buildings designed by the partnership that demonstrates an Art Deco influence.

Gazetted in 1849, the town of Gayndah initially developed as the centre for a number of large sheep stations taken up in the Burnett region during the 1840s. Gayndah's early growth as a pastoral "capital" is largely attributed to the determination of the squatters, and for a short time, the town reputedly rivalled Brisbane as the capital for Queensland. Gayndah also developed as the administrative centre for the area - a school (Gayndah State School) was established in 1861, and post office and court house were erected. A branch of the Commercial Banking Company of Sydney was opened in 1864, and a local government authority was established in 1867. By the late nineteenth century, cattle had replaced sheep as the dominant pastoral activity. Citrus orchards also flourished, and together with cattle and dairy farming, provided the basis for the development of Gayndah from the turn of the century.

The first local authority was convened in 1867 and a Town Council, consisting of a mayor and three aldermen was elected by poll. In 1882 the Rawbelle Divisional Board was established and attended to all business outside the jurisdiction of the Town Council until 1922 when a new board known as the Rawbelle-Gayndah Joint Board was formed and comprised a delegation from Gayndah. 1925 saw the merging of the Town Council with the Joint Board to form the Gayndah Shire Council, which consisted of a Chairman and six councillors.

The site for the proposed Town Hall had been acquired in 1924 possibly through arrears in rates payments. The block (1 rood 14.4 perches (1,380 m^{2})) was subdivided in October 1929 and the southern section (25.8 perches (650 m^{2})) was transferred to the Queensland Country Women's Association.

At a meeting of the local progress association on 29 September 1933 it was resolved to proceed with the Town Hall project which was supported by the Gayndah branch of the RSSILA and the Gayndah Chamber of Commerce.

To design the council chambers the Town Council engaged the Brisbane architectural firm of Hall and Phillips. Hall and Phillips had formed a partnership in 1929, when Lionel Blythewood Phillips was admitted into partnership with Thomas Ramsay Hall formerly of Hall and Prentice, who designed the Brisbane City Hall and Ascot Chambers. Hall and Phillips continued in practice until 1948 and their projects included the Shell Building in Ann Street, The Empire Theatre, Toowoomba, the Nambour Town Hall and shire offices at Gatton, Murweh, Boonah, Dalby and Monto.

The Council Offices were designed to include the Council Chambers, a general office, a spare office and offices for the Town Clerk, the Health Officer and the Engineer. The Hall included ladies and gentlemen's cloak rooms a ticket office, the hall and stage, dressing rooms and a supper verandah with kitchen. Separate public toilets with a septic system were constructed at the rear of the hall.

The estimate for the cost of the building was £6,000. Application was made to the Queensland Treasury for a subsidy of £3,000 and a loan of £3,000. Tenders were called in March 1934 for a new concrete Town Hall at Gayndah. H E McDonnell was the engineer for the project and Tom Cullen, was the foreman.

The Council Offices were complete by May 1935 with the Hall completed a short time after. The building which was named the Gayndah and District Soldiers Memorial Hall and Council Chambers was officially opened on 19 July 1935 by the Hon Ned Hanlon in commemoration of the employment relief loan the Gayndah Town Council had received from the Queensland Government in order to construct the building. Problems associated with the availability of materials and the quality of the day labour sent to work on the project are recorded in the Council minutes and may explain the moderation of the detailing in the building as constructed as compared with the published drawings.

The project which cost £7,012 received an additional £500 subsidy and £500 loan from the government and excluded the furnishings and fitting out of the toilets. The building, described as a nice example of modern architecture in the 12 October 1934 edition of the Building journal, added a new type of architecture to the town. The Town Hall Pictures and supper rooms opened on 7 August 1935 and were operated by lessees continually until 1997 when picture shows were discontinued in the hall.

Thursday nights were reserved for functions other than pictures and various committees held balls and concerts at the Hall. The balls were well attended until the mid 1960s and with three different picture programs a week, the Town Hall offered a wide cross section of the community an opportunity for entertainment.

In 1974 alterations were made to enlarge the supper room and upgrade the kitchen with funds provided by the RED scheme. An office and a kitchenette were added to the rear of the Council Offices at this time. The original lighting, removed in the 1980s and additional lights installed has since been reinstated alongside the new lighting. Other changes include the removal of the gates to the vestibules - these are stored on the site and the construction of a brick toilet block on the corner of Capper and Pineapple Streets.

== Description ==
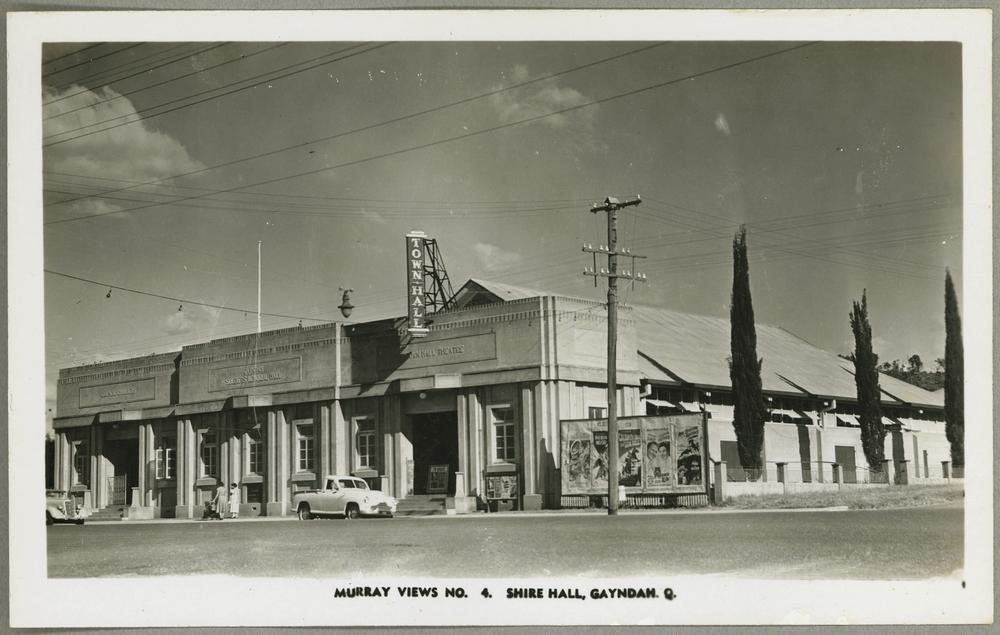
Gayndah Shire Hall, circa 1955

Gayndah Town Hall and Council Chambers is a single storeyed rendered concrete building with corrugated iron roof situated on the southern corner of Capper and Pineapple Streets, Gayndah. The hall is set back from the Pineapple Street footpath providing for a lawn along its western side. The lawn, located below the footpath level is surrounded by a low concrete retaining wall and iron fence to the south and west and by the later toilet block to the north.

The L-shaped building has a symmetrically composed facade comprising three bays with a projecting central bay. The entrances to the Council Chambers and Town Hall Theatre are located in the end bays above which a raised signage panel on the parapet clearly denotes these functions. The central bay signage panel bears the name, Gayndah Soldiers' Memorial Hall.

The fenestration comprises pairs of three-light casements and fanlight which are separated by pilasters with simple vertical detailing and articulated by raised vertical and horizontal rendered concrete bands. The pilasters finish to the underside of a wide string course that projects forward to form a hood at each entrance and at the centre of the building. The parapet is decorated on its upper edge and on a string course below with a vertical lined pattern which creates a subtle crenellated silhouette.

The skillion roof to the Council Chambers has sloping parapets at each end which conceals it to the east and separates it from the gable roof over the hall and skillion roof over the bio box behind the facade. The hall roof is hipped at its southern end and has a ventilated gablet at each end.

The hall is entered via stairs to a vestibule with ticket office. The ladies' and men's cloak rooms are located on either side of the vestibule and have cement rendered walls, fibrous cement sheeted ceilings with timber cover battens and timber floors. Inside, the Hall is framed with arched timber trusses between which the curved ceiling is lined with fibrous panels and timber cover strips. Timber lattice ventilation panels are located in the centre of the ceiling between the trusses. The floor is timber framed on concrete stumps and is lined with crow's ash. The stage has a simply detailed battened proscenium and dressing rooms open off the eastern side. The supper room and kitchen, which has been altered and extended is also located on the eastern side and has been altered more recently with floor covered and banks of louvres. A structure above the entrance to the hall to access the sound and lighting equipment is a later obtrusive addition.

The council offices are entered via stairs to a public space which retains its original counter. The offices are divided by timber and glass partitions and the Council Chambers are lined with timber panelling. The ceilings are lined throughout with fibrous cement sheeting and timber cover battens and the furniture in the Council Chambers dates from the original fit out.

The detached public toilets are a cement rendered building with corrugated iron roof and concrete slab floor. These are used as general storage.

With the exception of the later additions to the rear of the council offices and the supper room, the Gayndah Town Hall is very intact.

== Heritage listing ==
Gayndah Shire Hall was listed on the Queensland Heritage Register on 28 September 2001 having satisfied the following criteria.

The place is important in demonstrating the evolution or pattern of Queensland's history.

The Gayndah Shire Hall constructed in 1935 and in continued use since that time demonstrates the development of Gayndah during the 1930s and reflects the optimism of the Shire for the future of the district.

The place is important in demonstrating the principal characteristics of a particular class of cultural places.

The Gayndah Shire Hall is an important example of a regional Town Hall designed by the Brisbane architectural partnership, Hall and Phillips. The building, which comprises council offices, chambers and theatre is in an intact condition and is still in use for its original purpose.

The building has a special association with the community of Gayndah and District and with its designers, Hall and Phillips who designed many fine buildings in south-east Queensland.

The place is important because of its aesthetic significance.

The building has aesthetic significance as a well composed building designed to illustrate the progressive nature of the Town Council.

The place has a strong or special association with a particular community or cultural group for social, cultural or spiritual reasons.

The building has a high level of social significance as a centrally located civic building which has been the focus of the communities' activities since 1935.
