= Gayndah War Memorial =

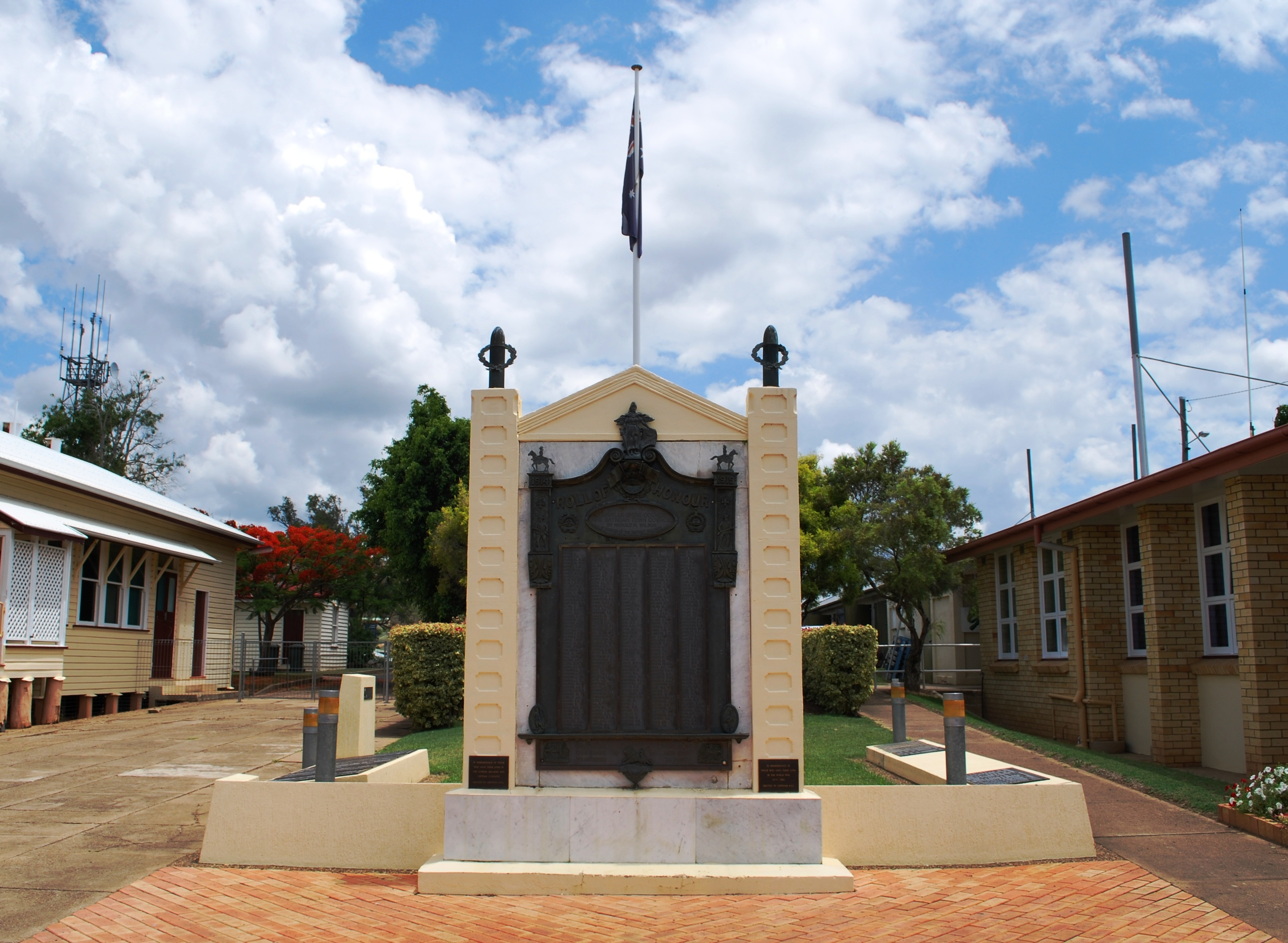
- Gayndah War Memorial, 2008

- Location within Queensland
- 25.6266°S 151.6102°E
- Location: Capper Street, Gayndah, North Burnett Region, Queensland, Australia

History
- Design period: 1919–1930s (interwar period)
- Built: 1921–1995

Site notes
- Architect: Ernest Gunderson

Queensland Heritage Register
- Official name: Gayndah War Memorial, Rawbelle Shire War Memorial
- Type: state heritage (built)
- Designated: 21 October 1992
- Reference no.: 600517
- Significant period: 1921– (social); 1921 (historical, fabric)
- Significant components: war trophy/ies, memorial – honour board/ roll of honour, memorial – other
- Builders: Ernest Gunderson

Gayndah War Memorial is a heritage-listed memorial at Capper Street, Gayndah, North Burnett Region, Queensland, Australia. It was designed and built in 1921 by Ernest Gunderson. It is also known as Rawbelle Shire War Memorial. It was added to the Queensland Heritage Register on 21 October 1992.

== History ==
The Gayndah War Memorial to the First World War was presented to the Rawbelle Shire and Gayndah Town Councils by Harold Wilson in 1921. It was designed and produced by Ernest Gunderson and honours the 270 local men who served during the First World War, including those who died.

This memorial was privately commissioned by Harold Wilson of nearby Cooranga station, and then donated to the local shires. It was unveiled by Mr Bernard Corser M.L.A. on 8 September 1919.

Gazetted in 1849, the town of Gayndah initially developed as the centre for a number of large sheep stations taken up in the Burnett region during the 1840s. Gayndah's early growth as a pastoral "capital" is largely attributed to the determination of the squatters, and for a short time, the town reputedly rivalled Brisbane as the capital for Queensland. Gayndah also developed as the administrative centre for the area, as a school (Gayndah State School) was established in 1861, and post office and court house were erected. A branch of the Commercial Banking Company of Sydney was opened in 1864, and a local government authority (Rawbelle Divisional Board) was established in 1867. By the late nineteenth century, cattle had replaced sheep as the dominant pastoral activity. Citrus orchards also flourished, and together with cattle and dairy farming, provided the basis for the development of Gayndah from the turn of the century.

Australia, and Queensland in particular, had few civic monuments before the First World War. The memorials erected in its wake became our first national monuments, recording the devastating impact of the war on a young nation. Australia lost 60,000 from a population of about 4 million, representing one in five of those who served. No previous or subsequent war has made such an impact on the nation.

Even before the end of the war, memorials became a spontaneous and highly visible expression of national grief. To those who erected them, they were as sacred as grave sites, substitute graves for the Australians whose bodies lay in battlefield cemeteries in Europe and the Middle East. British policy decreed that the Empire war dead were to be buried where they fell. The word "cenotaph", commonly applied to war memorials at the time, literally means "empty tomb".

Australian war memorials are distinctive in that they commemorate not only the dead. Australians were proud that their first great national army, unlike other belligerent armies, was composed entirely of volunteers, men worthy of honour whether or not they paid the supreme sacrifice. Many memorials honour all who served from a locality, not just the dead, providing valuable evidence of community involvement in the war. Such evidence is not readily obtainable from military records, or from state or national listings, where names are categorised alphabetically or by military unit.

Australian war memorials are also valuable evidence of imperial and national loyalties, at the time, not seen as conflicting; the skills of local stonemasons, metalworkers and architects; and of popular taste. In Queensland, the digger (soldier) statue was the popular choice of memorial, whereas the obelisk predominated in the southern states, possibly a reflection of Queensland's larger working-class population and a lesser involvement of architects.

Many of the First World War monuments have been updated to record local involvement in later conflicts, and some have fallen victim to unsympathetic re-location and repair.

Although honour boards are a common type of war memorial, they are usually situated internally in a publicly accessible place such as the local Shire Hall.

The main honour board at Gayndah is located externally in a public square between the Post Office and the Library. It was commissioned from the firm of Ernest Gunderson and is regarded as the company's finest piece of work. Indeed, Gunderson himself considered it to be his finest work.

Ernest Gunderson established his metalworking company in Brisbane after migrating from Norway. The company operated until the mid 1930s and supplied honour boards statewide. The distinctively original artwork was modelled by Gunderson and then applied to a blackened brass framework. The board at Gayndah displays an unusual combination of both Australian and British motifs as well as a large number of symbolic emblems. The re-use of items such as the artillery shells was a common feature of Gunderson's work.

In the 1960s, some unsuccessful renovation work was undertaken, resulting in the original brass lettering and backing (which still exists in storage) being replaced with the present nameplates. Other minor alterations were also made at this time.

In anticipation of the fiftieth anniversary of the end of the Pacific War (August 1995), some of the damaged and lost items of the intervening wars were reinstated. The lost figure of Liberty was remodelled in bronze by Brisbane sculptor Fred Waitehouse from photographs of the original, and the rather two-dimensional bronze horsemen were cast (and made slightly more three-dimensional) from the identical figures on Gunderson's memorial at Petrie.

The 1903 Krupp war trophy gun was repaired and fitted with replicated wheels and armour and mounted to address the street. A small commemorative garden was constructed and a surrounding series of concrete slabs holding recent memorials commemorating personnel from the locality who served in the Second World War, and later conflicts up to Somalia.

Completed in 1995, the new work and repairs to the Second World War items were researched and organised by local RSL identity "Sam" Weller and the costs were donated by Frank Robinson on behalf of his family.

The First World War Memorial was originally complemented by a fence and a light which was removed, possibly to make way for the 1995 additions. The original flagstaff has also been replaced.

== Description ==
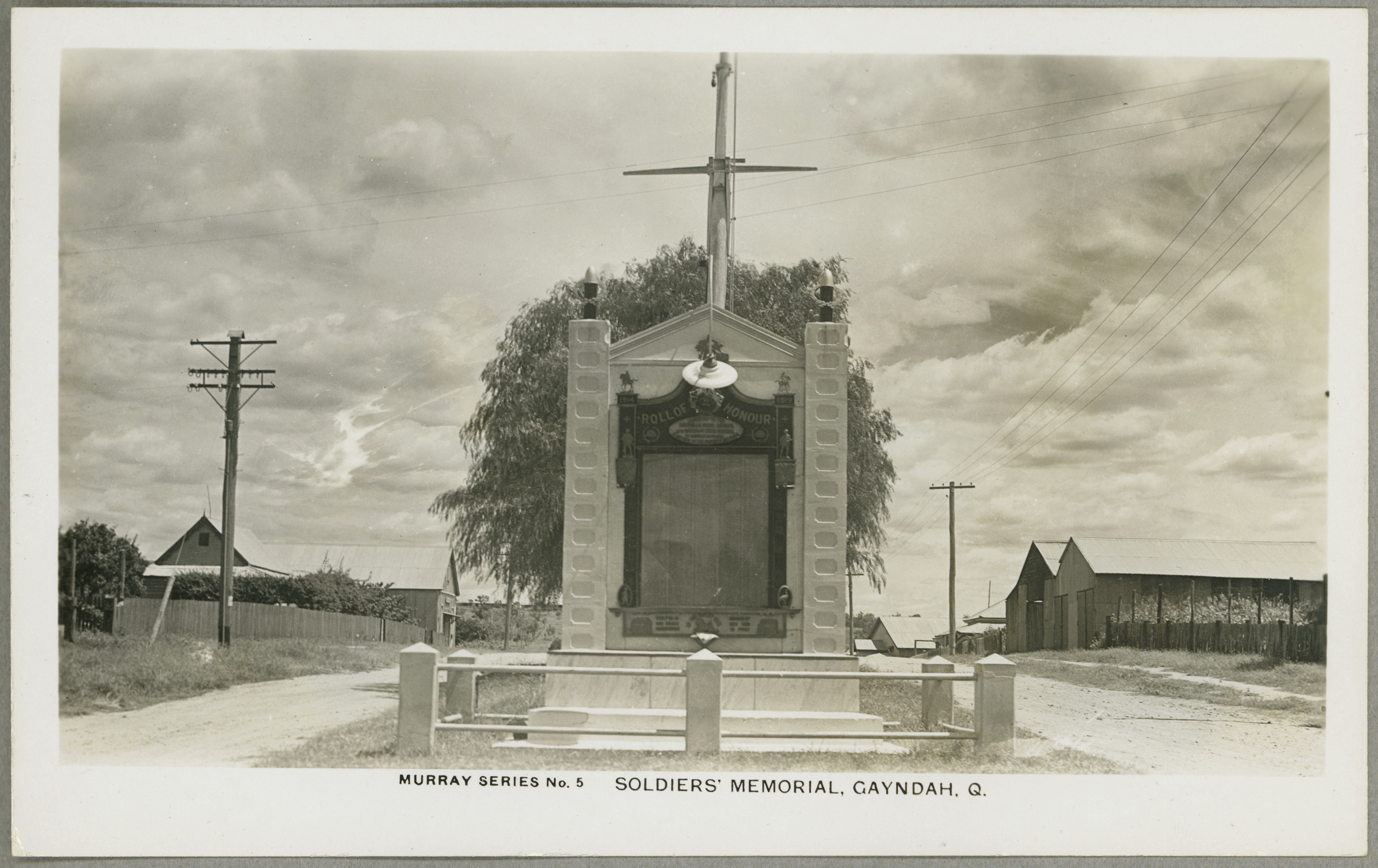
War memorial at Gayndah, circa 1950

The First World War Memorial is situated between the Post Office and the Library in Capper Street, Gayndah and directly addresses the street. Behind is a memorial garden comprising a trophy gun, paving and garden beds, and surrounding concrete slabs which commemorate service personnel of the Second World War and subsequent conflicts up to Somalia. The Second World War names are incised in white granite, and the other plaques are in bronze.

The First World War Memorial is of concrete and bronze and comprises a bronze art metal honour board mounted on a freestanding concrete structure.

The concrete structure sits on a wide stepped base, also of concrete apart from the central portion of the upper step which is marble veneered. The structure itself comprises a flat central section capped with a triangular pediment and flanked by two square pillars with a simple repetitive motif on the front faces. The pillars are surmounted by artillery shells encircled with bronze wreaths. At the foot of each pillar are bronze plaques commemorating later conflicts.

The bronze honour board is mounted on the central section. It displays the names of the local men who served in the First World War with those who died identified by a small crown after their name. The five columns of names are centrally located on the board and are covered by clear glass in a metal frame.

The upper section of the board is capped with scrollwork flanking a female figure of Britannia holding a shield of "Liberty". The figure stands above a laurel wreath encircling crossed flags and the words "FOR KING AND COUNTRY". An oval plaque indicating the origins of the memorial sits below the wreaths and is flanked by AIF badges. The words "ROLL OF HONOUR" follow the line of the scrollwork. On each side of this central section are pilasters capped by figures of mounted Light Horsemen above the dates 1914–1919. Relief work of infantry men are displayed at the bottom of each pilaster.

The lower section of the board displays oval plaques in each corner with relief work of an emu and a kangaroo. Additional relief work comprises a British lion and a kangaroo in the centre and cannons at each side.

== Heritage listing ==
Gayndah War Memorial was listed on the Queensland Heritage Register on 21 October 1992 having satisfied the following criteria.

The place is important in demonstrating the evolution or pattern of Queensland's history.

War Memorials are important in demonstrating the pattern of Queensland's history as they are representative of a recurrent theme that involved most communities throughout the state. They provide evidence of an era of widespread Australian patriotism and nationalism, particularly during and following the First World War.

The place demonstrates rare, uncommon or endangered aspects of Queensland's cultural heritage.

This particular memorial is a rare example of a war memorial which was privately commissioned and then donated as a public memorial, and later supplemented by another major private donation.

The place is important in demonstrating the principal characteristics of a particular class of cultural places.

The monuments manifest a unique documentary record and are demonstrative of popular taste in the inter-war period.

Erected in 1921, the memorial at Gayndah demonstrates the principal characteristics of a commemorative structure erected as an enduring record of a major historical event. This is achieved through the use of appropriate materials and design elements.

The place is important because of its aesthetic significance.

The memorial and its setting are of aesthetic significance for their high degree of workmanship and design and for their contribution to the aesthetic qualities of the townscape.

The place has a strong or special association with a particular community or cultural group for social, cultural or spiritual reasons.

It has a strong and continuing association with the community as evidence of the impact of a major historic event and as the focal point for the remembrance of that event.

The place has a special association with the life or work of a particular person, group or organisation of importance in Queensland's history.

It also has special association with metal worker Ernest Gunderson as the finest example of his work in Queensland.
