= Mellors Drapery and Haberdashery =

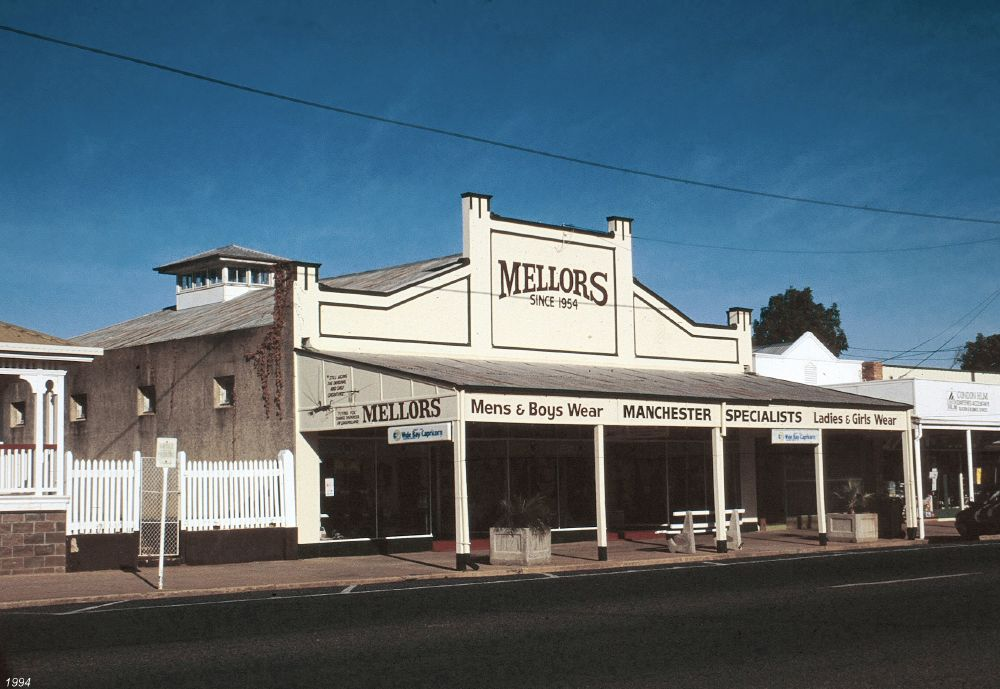
- Mellors Drapery and Haberdashery, 1994

- Location within Queensland Location within Australia
- 25.6254°S 151.6097°E
- Location: 28 Capper Street, Gayndah, North Burnett Region, Queensland, Australia

History
- Design period: 1919–1930s (interwar period)
- Built: 1922

Queensland Heritage Register
- Official name: Mellors Drapery and Haberdashery, Overells
- Type: state heritage (built)
- Designated: 8 August 1994
- Reference no.: 601470
- Significant period: 1920s (fabric); 1922–ongoing (historical use)
- Significant components: toilet block/earth closet/water closet, furniture/fittings, shed/s

Mellors Drapery and Haberdashery is a heritage-listed shop at 28 Capper Street, Gayndah, North Burnett Region, Queensland, Australia. It was built in 1922. It is also known as Overells. It was added to the Queensland Heritage Register on 8 August 1994.

== History ==
This single-storeyed building was completed by 1922 for Overells Pty Ltd, and replaced a previous building which had been destroyed by fire in May 1921.

Gazetted in 1849, the town of Gayndah initially developed as the centre for a number of large sheep stations taken up in the Burnett region during the 1840s. Gayndah's early growth as a pastoral "capital" is largely attributed to the determination of the squatters, and for a short time, the town reputedly rivalled Brisbane as the capital for Queensland. Gayndah also developed as the administrative centre for the area, as Gayndah State School was established in 1861, and post office and court house were erected. A branch of the Commercial Banking Company of Sydney was opened in 1864, and a local government authority (Borough of Gayndah) was established in 1867. By the late nineteenth century, cattle had replaced sheep as the dominant pastoral activity. Citrus orchards also flourished, and together with cattle and dairy farming, provided the basis for the development of Gayndah from the turn of the century.

The land on which the shop stands was acquired by Andrew Brown of Gayndah in 1858, then by Francis Brown in 1864. The titles documents describe Francis Brown as a storekeeper of Gayndah, and include mention of houses and buildings, possibly referring to a shop on this site. Following Francis' death in 1910, the land was acquired by Martin Conrad Stephenson of Gayndah in 1911. Stephenson is listed in directories as a store manager.

The land was acquired by William Henry Williams, a Maryborough merchant in 1911. It is likely that Overells leased the shop from Williams at around this time, as they are recorded as having premises in Gayndah from c. 1912. Photographic evidence indicates that the building was divided into two; one half occupied by Overells and the other half by Ford's Cash Store.

Between May and July 1921, three separate fires in the main street of Gayndah destroyed a total of nine shops, including the Overells and Fords building. Overells suffered a loss of approximately £3000. Shortly after the fire, Overells purchased the site of the former shop, and had commenced rebuilding their shop by August 1921, when it was noted that the new premises "will be an imposing structure when completed".

Overells established in Brisbane in the early 1880s, when William James Overell moved to Brisbane from Tasmania. Overell opened a store in Fortitude Valley in 1883, and a store in Queen Street in 1891. The floods of 1893 destroyed the entire stock in the Queen Street store. The store in Fortitude Valley was removed to the corner of Brunswick and Wickham Streets c. 1901, and was completely destroyed by fire in 1904. The store was rebuilt the following year. By 1910, Overells had established a number of country branches, which included Charleville, Laidley and Pittsworth.

The new Gayndah store was completed in early 1922. The recollection of a former employee of Overells, describes the re-opening of the shop as a gala day for old Gayndah.

In June 1933, all Overells stores held a 50th anniversary sale.

Ownership of the site was transferred to Rothberg & Co Pty Ltd in 1937, then Ronald and Edna Beaton in 1943. Ronald Beaton is listed in directories as a Gayndah storekeeper.

In 1954, Cedric Mellor, of the firm Reddan and Mellor, took out a ten-year lease on the shop. Reddan and Mellor, General Drapers and Boot and Shoe Warehousemen, had been established in 1886 at Bundaberg, by Michael Reddan and William Mellor (Cedric's father). Although Cedric Mellor moved to Gayndah in 1954, Reddan and Mellor of Bundaberg continued to trade under both names, finally closing in 1985.

Mellors Pty Ltd purchased the Gayndah shop in 1963, and John Mellor, grandson of William Mellor, has been Managing Director of the business since 1973. The rear of the building was extended during the 1960s.

== Description ==
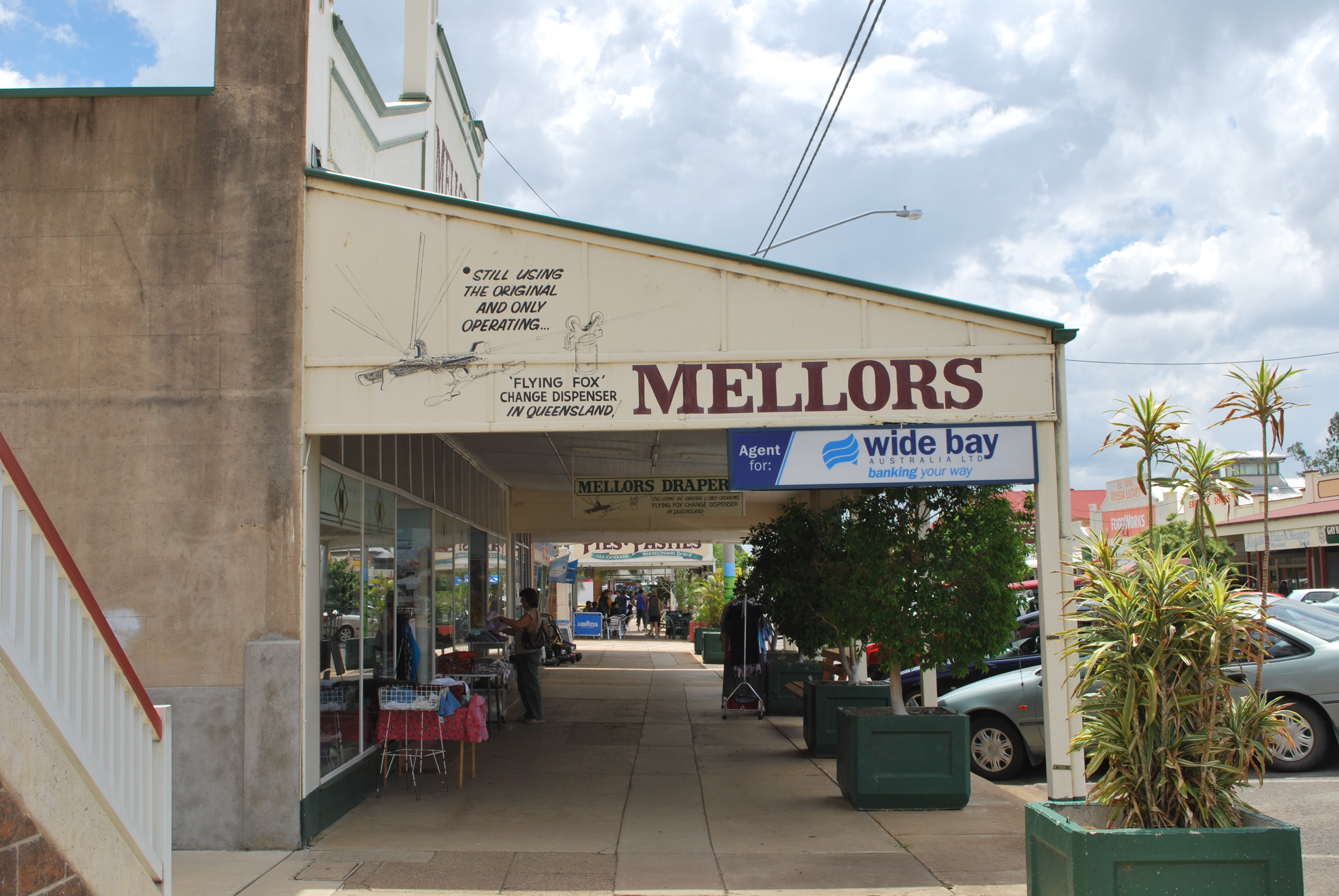
Footpath view showing claim about the "flying fox", 2008

Prominently located on the main street in Gayndah, Mellors Drapery is a single storeyed rectangular structure of concrete and timber with a corrugated iron roof.

The street facade, which faces approximately north northeast, is symmetrically arranged. It consists of a skillion roofed footpath awning supported by five timber posts, a glazed shopfront below the awning and a decorative parapet wall above. A flat ceiling lines the underside of the awning.

The decorative parapet, shaped to conceal the roof behind, consists of two peripheral bays and a central bay. The junctions between each of these bays is marked by an implied pilaster which protrudes above the remainder of the parapet. The lower peripheral bays slope up to a raised central bay; a rectangular panel which carries the name of the store. Mouldings are used to emphasise the composition.

With the exception of the shopfront the external walls of the building are massive reinforced concrete, cast in situ. The timber framed roof which terminates as a gable behind the parapet wall is hipped at the southerly end. A hipped roofed lantern is located on the ridge of the roof.

The shop front consists of three large display windows separated by two recessed entries. A strip of obscure fixed glass above the display windows lets light into the interior of the store. Each entry is fitted with a set of double timber doors and opens directly onto the interior of the shop.

The interior, a single large space, is divided along its central axis by a row of large timber posts supporting a timber beam which run from the front to the rear of the store. Male oriented departments are located to the east and female to the west of the axis. High level windows run along the upper part of the side wall which faces east southeast; the opposite wall has no window openings. Connecting the service areas on the easterly and westerly sides of the store with an elevated cash desk is a suspended wire system. The cash desk is located on the central axis near the rear of the store. An ornate metal and timber cash carrier known as a "flying fox" transports change between the service areas and the cash desk via this system of taut wires.

The entire space has a flat panelled fibrous cement ceiling with timber cover strips. Some panels feature lattice vents and pressed metal ceiling roses. A large skylight positioned on the axis between two posts illuminates the centre of the space. The sides of the skylight, lined similarly to the ceiling, slope inwards towards the top and terminate in the windows of the roof lantern. The timber framed pine floor is covered in carpet squares. The store retains many original timber shop fittings, including shelving units, timber counters and display cabinets. A skillion roofed extension, timber framed and clad in fibrous cement, has been built onto the back of the store near the south west corner.

A set of timber double doors, centrally located in the rear wall behind the cash desk, open onto an external flight of concrete steps leading to the back yard. Structures in this area include a timber and fibro shed with shallow pitched skillion roof and a small brick toilet block. Access to the yard is via an easement leading to Pineapple Street.

== Heritage listing ==
Mellors Drapery and Haberdashery was listed on the Queensland Heritage Register on 8 August 1994 having satisfied the following criteria.

The place is important in demonstrating the evolution or pattern of Queensland's history.

Mellors Drapery and Haberdashery, erected by 1922, is situated on land which has been the site of a store in Gayndah from the late 19th century, and as such, demonstrates the development of the town as a commercial centre for the Burnett district.

The place demonstrates rare, uncommon or endangered aspects of Queensland's cultural heritage.

The intact interior space complete with many fittings such as shelves, display cabinets and counters housing a traditional range of merchandise organised into departments is a rare survivor of the pressures of commerce. In particular the flying fox cash dispenser provides rare evidence of money handling technology of the early 20th century.

The place is important in demonstrating the principal characteristics of a particular class of cultural places.

Mellors, an excellent and comprehensive example of a medium-sized provincial store, is outstanding in its preservation of not only the physical fabric - the mass concrete construction, characteristic shop front, elegant interior and skylight; but also of the social fabric - a relatively unchanged style of management and service.

The place has a special association with the life or work of a particular person, group or organisation of importance in Queensland's history.

Built in the early 1920s as a country branch of Overells Pty Ltd, the store has an association with Overells, previously one of the major department stores in Queensland. Mellors continues its association with the Mellor family, who have been connected with retailing in central Queensland from 1886.
