= Gayndah Court House =

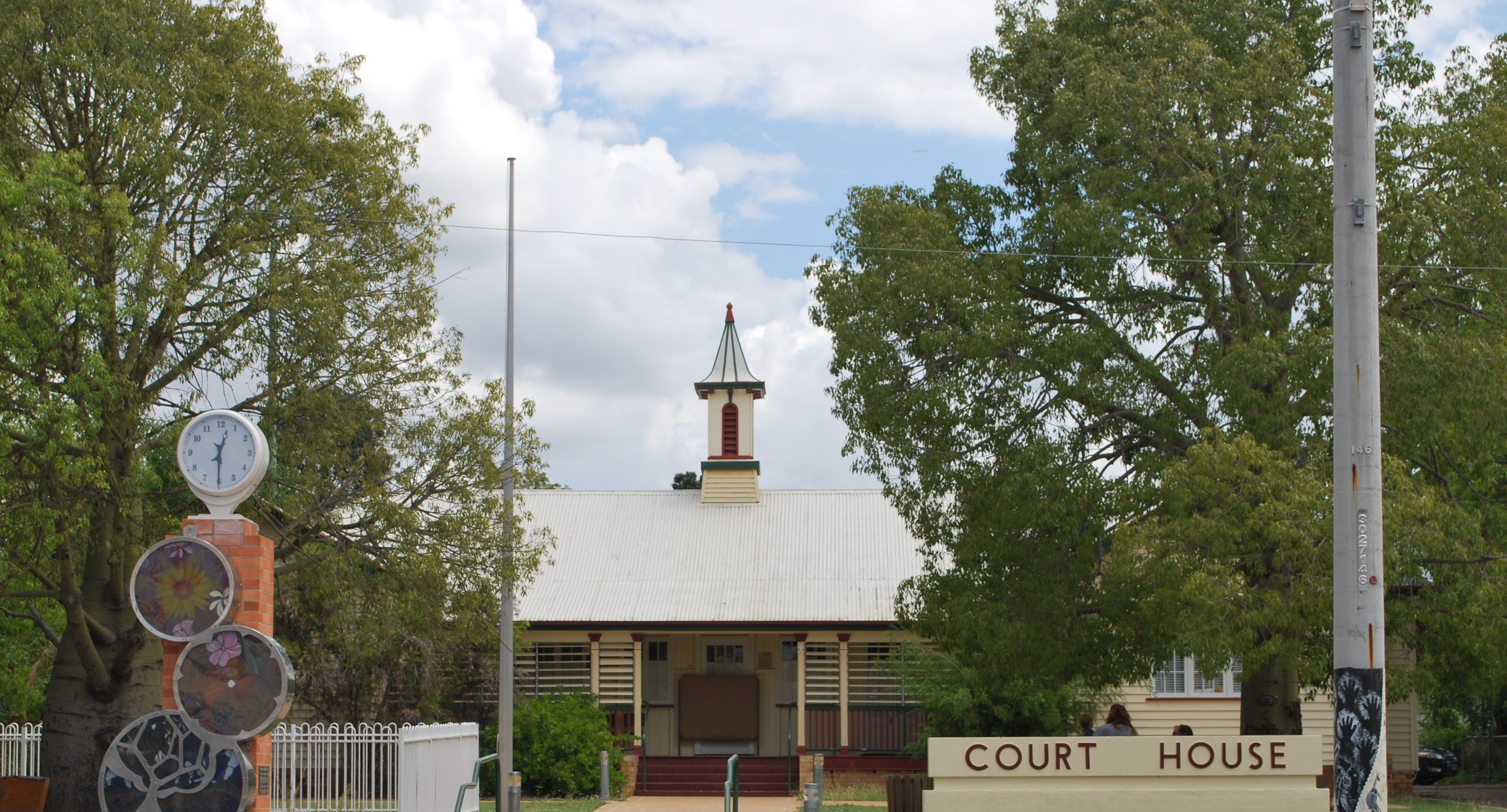
- Gayndah Court House, 2008

- Location within Queensland Location within Australia
- 25.6254°S 151.6091°E
- Location: 20 Capper Street, Gayndah, North Burnett Region, Queensland, Australia

History
- Design period: 1919–1930s (interwar period)
- Built: 1928

Site notes
- Architect: Department of Public Works (Queensland)
- Architectural style: Classicism

Queensland Heritage Register
- Official name: Court House, Gayndah
- Type: state heritage (landscape, built)
- Designated: 13 January 1995
- Reference no.: 601294
- Significant period: 1920s (historical); 1928–1940s (fabric); 1928–ongoing (social)
- Significant components: office/s, trees/plantings, court house

Gayndah Court House is a courthouse at 20 Capper Street, Gayndah, North Burnett Region, Queensland, Australia designed by the Queensland Department of Public Works, built in 1928. It was added to the Queensland Heritage Register on 13 January 1995.

== History ==
=== Local ===
Located in the business centre of Gayndah, the Court House was erected in 1928, and replaced an earlier brick court house building located approximately half a mile from the present court house. The court house was designed in the office of the Department of Public Works; Andrew Baxter Leven was Government Architect at the time.

Gazetted in 1849, the town of Gayndah initially developed as the centre for a number of large sheep stations taken up in the Burnett region during the 1840s. Gayndah's early growth as a pastoral "capital" is largely attributed to the determination of the squatters, and for a short time, the town reputedly rivalled Brisbane as the capital for Queensland. Gayndah also developed as the administrative centre for the area, as a school (Gayndah State School) was established in 1861, and post office and court house were erected. A branch of the Commercial Banking Company of Sydney was opened in 1864, and a local government authority (Borough of Gayndah) was established in 1867. By the late nineteenth century, cattle had replaced sheep as the dominant pastoral activity. Citrus orchards also flourished, and together with cattle and dairy farming, provided the basis for the development of Gayndah from the turn of the century.

=== Building ===
The earliest official building records for the former court house refer to the addition of a verandah in 1861. The former court house, erected probably during the 1850s, and police buildings were located on a site adjoining the former hospital grounds east of the town centre.

By the mid 1910s, the court house facilities were insufficient, and inconveniently situated away from the central business area, and the erection of a new building was proposed. Although an allotment fronting Capper Street, in the centre of town, was reserved by the Queensland Government in 1922 as a suitable site for a court house, and preliminary plans were drawn the following year, it was not until 1927 that the final plans for the new building were prepared.

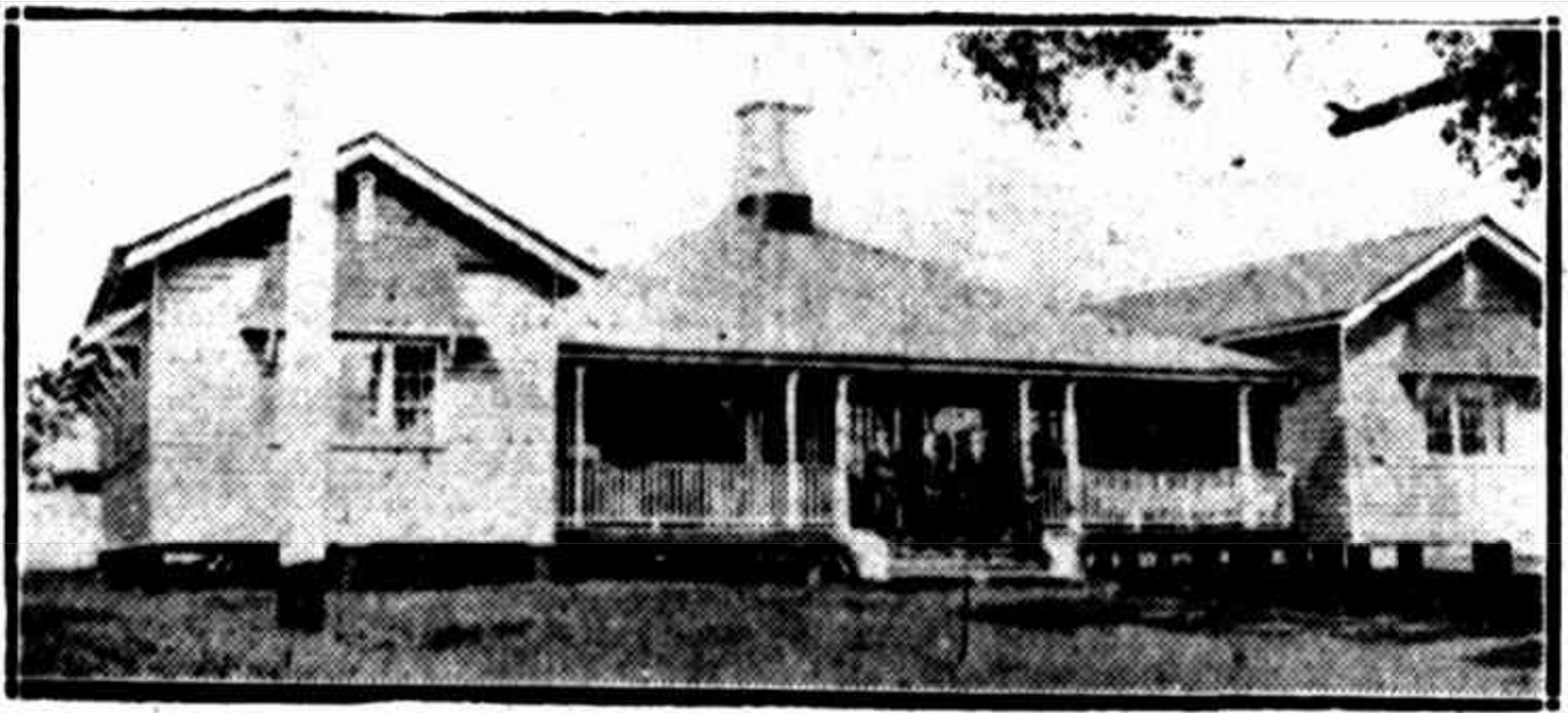
Court house, as completed in October 1928

The building was completed in October 1928. The new building was occupied early in 1929, and provided accommodation for Court business, the Police Magistrates, the Land Commissioner and Land Rangers, the Clerk of Petty Sessions and public offices, the Dairy Inspector, the Agricultural Bank and storeroom facilities. The plan of the building with the offices located at the front, closest to the street, and the court room at the rear, is a variation of the more usual arrangement found in timber court houses, where the court room is at the front and the offices are at the rear of the building.

A laboratory was added to the northern end of the office (front) section of the building in 1944, for the newly appointed Research Officer from the Queensland Department of Agriculture and Stock. Buildings at the rear of the court house included an Agriculture and Stock storage shed, a Citrus Budwood shed (as part of the Citrus Budwood and Seed Distribution Scheme), a garage and earth closets.

Despite proposals during the mid 1960s, to remove the court house to a site in Pineapple Street adjacent to the police station (erected in 1935), in order to construct a swimming pool on the court house site, the court house remains in its central location.

== Description ==
Situated in Capper Street, the main street of Gayndah, the Court House is a single-storeyed timber building with a hipped corrugated-iron roof and two projecting gables. A verandah runs along the front of the building between the gables. The gables have bell-cast timber-boarded sun hoods over the windows. The large central ventilator on the roof is the dominant decorative element of the building. The exterior of the court house is reasonably intact, except for metal louvres enclosing the verandahs. The Court House is set back from the footpath, and punctuates the streetscape which is composed of shops with verandahs supported on posts over the footpath

Gayndah Court House is a typical example of the work of the Public Works Department and is a continuation of the tradition of timber court houses in Queensland country towns, adapting to civic function vernacular elements and materials common to domestic buildings. The building has a T-shaped plan, with offices along the front and the court room at the rear. The grounds of the court house contain a number of bottle-trees, Brachychiton spp. Other important buildings in the town precinct include the two timber banks, the two hotels and the Shire Offices.

== Heritage listing ==
The Gayndah Court House was listed on the Queensland Heritage Register on 13 January 1995 having satisfied the following criteria.

The place is important in demonstrating the evolution or pattern of Queensland's history.

Erected in 1928, to replace a court house dating probably from the 1850s, the Gayndah Court House survives as an important illustration of the pattern of Gayndah's development as an official and commercial centre for the Burnett district of Queensland. The prominent central location of the court house in Gayndah, also demonstrates the importance of the court house and its associated offices within the town.

The place is important in demonstrating the principal characteristics of a particular class of cultural places.

Gayndah Court House is a good example of a timber court house in a provincial centre. It reflects the high standard of Government buildings in Queensland, designed by the Department of Public Works during the early-mid 20th century.

The place is important because of its aesthetic significance.

Through form, scale and materials, the Gayndah Court House contributes to the Capper Street streetscape and Gayndah townscape.

The place has a strong or special association with a particular community or cultural group for social, cultural or spiritual reasons.

The prominent central location of the court house in Gayndah, also demonstrates the importance of the court house and its associated offices within the town.
