= Shire of Biggenden =

Coordinates: 25°30′36.22″S 152°02′34.85″E

- Local government area
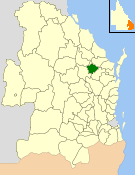
- Location within Queensland

- Country: Australia
- State: Queensland
- Established: 1905

Area
  - Total: 1,314.5 km^{2} (507.5 sq mi)

Population
  - Total: 1,506 (2006 census)
  - Density: 1.1457/km^{2} (2.9673/sq mi)
- Website: Shire of Biggenden
LGAs around Shire of Biggenden
Perry	Kolan	Isis
Gayndah	Shire of Biggenden	Woocoo
Gayndah	Gayndah	Woocoo

The Shire of Biggenden was a local government area located in the northern catchment of the Burnett River, Queensland, Australia, 100 kilometres (62 mi) south-southwest of the regional city of Bundaberg. The shire covered an area of 1,314.5 square kilometres (507.5 sq mi), and existed as a local government area from 1905 until 2008, when it amalgamated with several other shires to become the North Burnett Region.

Primary production is the most significant industry in the region with beef and dairy cattle being predominant. Other agricultural pursuits include grain crops, piggeries, peanuts, citrus and timber. The area is also rich in minerals. Biggenden Mine is located 8 kilometres (5 mi) from Biggenden along the Isis Highway. Gold, bismuth and more recently magnetite have been extracted from the mine.

The biggest landmarks in the region are Mount Walsh, which can be seen prominently over much of the shire and Paradise Dam, a large reservoir formed by the damming of the Burnett River.

== History ==
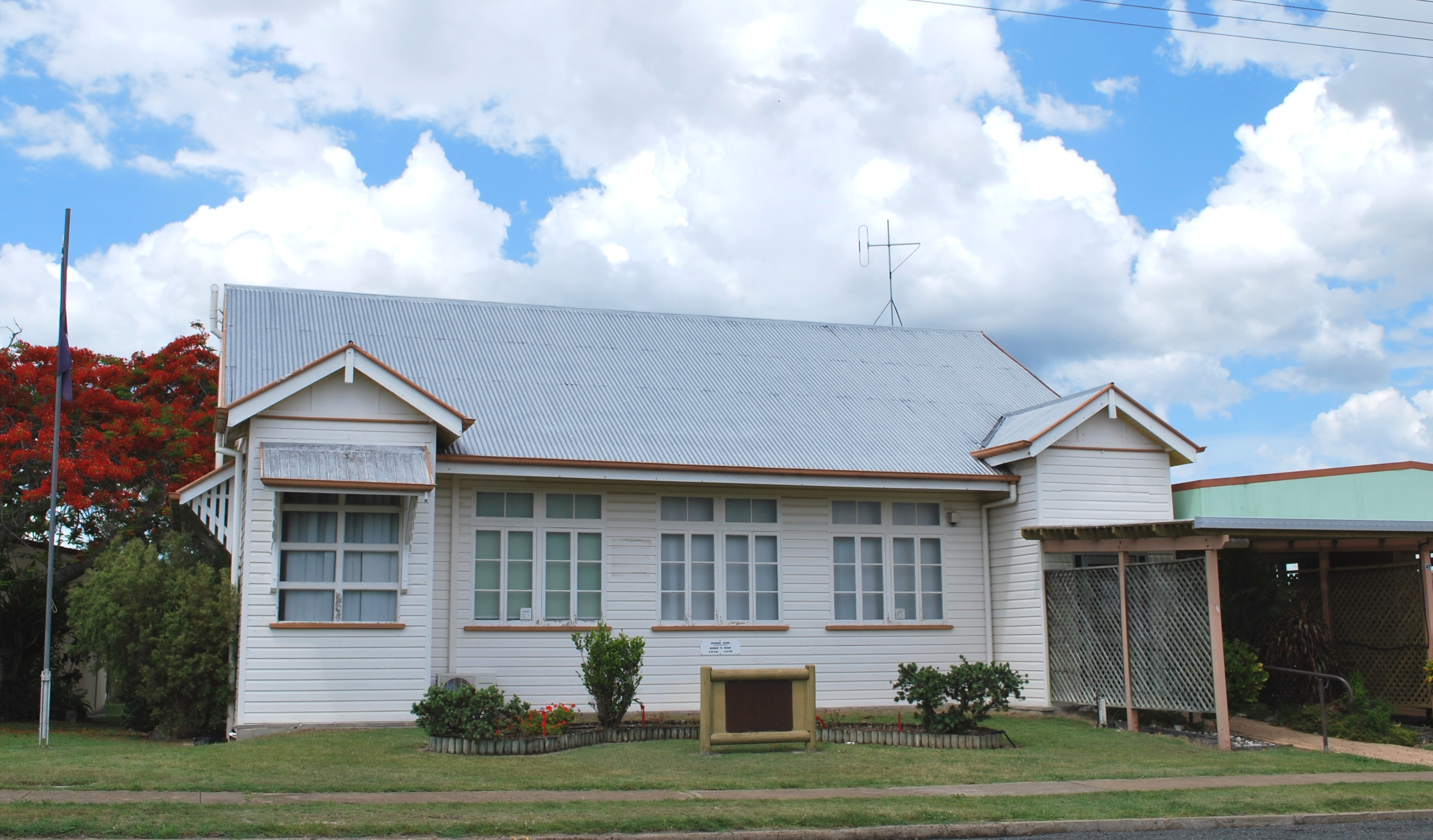
Biggenden Shire Office, 2008

On 3 June 1905, the No. 2 division of the Shire of Burrum was excised to create the Shire of Degilbo.

On 12 July 1941, the Shire of Degilbo was renamed to become the Shire of Biggenden.

On 15 March 2008, under the Local Government (Reform Implementation) Act 2007 passed by the Parliament of Queensland on 10 August 2007, the Shire of Biggenden merged with the Shires of Eidsvold, Gayndah, Monto, Mundubbera and Perry to form the North Burnett Region.

== Towns and localities ==
The Shire of Biggenden included the following settlements:

- Biggenden
- Coalstoun Lakes
- Dallarnil
- Didcot
- Degilbo

== Population ==
Year	Population
1933	2,476
1947	2,179
1954	1,974
1961	1,882
1966	1,722
1971	1,639
1976	1,532
1981	1,411
1986	1,553
1991	1,574
1996	1,570
2001	1,486
2006	1,506

== Chairmen and mayors ==
Chairmen

- 1927: Noah Minchenton
- 1928: J.C. Robertson

Mayors

- Betty Johnson (2004–2008)
