= Shire of Mundubbera =

- Local government area
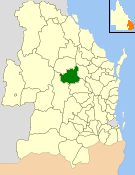
- Location within Queensland

- Country: Australia
- State: Queensland
- Region: Wide Bay–Burnett
- Established: 1915
- Council seat: Mundubbera

Area
  - Total: 4,192.8 km^{2} (1,618.8 sq mi)

Population
  - Total: 2,236 (2006 census)
  - Density: 0.53330/km^{2} (1.3812/sq mi)
- Website: Shire of Mundubbera
LGAs around Shire of Mundubbera
| Eidsvold | Eidsvold | Eidsvold |
| Chinchilla | Shire of Mundubbera | Gayndah |
| Wondai | Wondai | Gayndah |

The Shire of Mundubbera was a local government area in the northern catchment of the Burnett River, Queensland, Australia. The shire covered an area of 4,192.8 square kilometres (1,618.8 sq mi), and existed as a local government area from 1915 until 2008, when it amalgamated with several other shires to form the North Burnett Region.

The Shire's economy was based on citrus production, grain crops, beef cattle, pigs and dairying.

== History ==
The Shire of Auburn came into being on 19 May 1915, being created from part of the Shire of Eidsvold and part of the Shire of Rawbelle. However, the name was not a popular choice, eventually resulting in it being renamed Shire of Mundubbera on 5 January 1923. In 1932, it lost some of its area to the neighbouring shires of Eidsvold and Monto.

On 15 March 2008, under the Local Government (Reform Implementation) Act 2007 passed by the Parliament of Queensland on 10 August 2007, the Shire of Mundubbera merged with the Shires of Biggenden, Eidsvold, Gayndah, Monto and Perry to form the North Burnett Region.

== Towns and localities ==
The Shire of Mundubbera included the following settlements:

- Mundubbera
- Boynewood
- Dykehead
- Gurgeena
- Monogorilby
- Mundowran
- Philpott
- Riverleigh

== Population ==
| Year | Population |
|---|---|
| 1933 | 2,302 |
| 1947 | 2,064 |
| 1954 | 2,326 |
| 1961 | 2,617 |
| 1966 | 2,580 |
| 1971 | 2,391 |
| 1976 | 2,395 |
| 1981 | 2,481 |
| 1986 | 2,355 |
| 1991 | 2,340 |
| 1996 | 2,514 |
| 2001 | 2,451 |
| 2006 | 2,236 |

== Chairmen and mayors ==
- 1927: J. J. Hardy
- 2000–2004: Doug McIvor
- 2004–2008: Bruce Serisier
