= Shire of Monto =

- Local government area
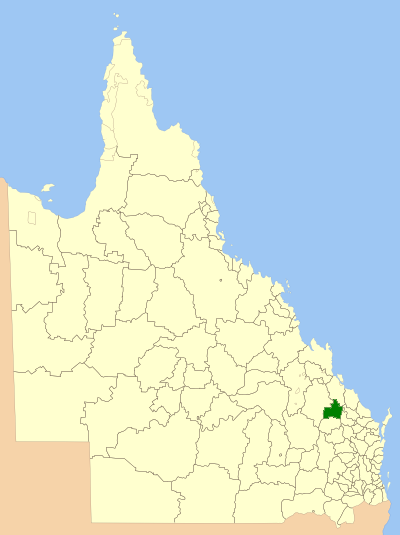
- Location within Queensland

- Country: Australia
- State: Queensland
- Region: Wide Bay–Burnett
- Established: 1932
- Council seat: Monto

Area
  - Total: 4,320.8 km^{2} (1,668.3 sq mi)

Population
  - Total: 2,577 (2006 census)
  - Density: 0.59642/km^{2} (1.5447/sq mi)
- Website: Shire of Monto
LGAs around Shire of Monto
Banana	Banana	Calliope
Banana	Shire of Monto	Perry
Banana	Eidsvold	Perry

The Shire of Monto was a local government area in the northern catchment of the Burnett River, Queensland, Australia. The shire covered an area of 4,320.8 square kilometres (1,668.3 sq mi), and existed as a local government area from 1932 until 2008, when it amalgamated with several other shires to form the North Burnett Region.

== History ==
The Monto district came into being as part of a Land Development Scheme for returning soldiers. The first town buildings were erected in 1926, followed by the Butter Factory in 1927. In July 1931 the railway was officially opened and on 3 March 1932, the Shire of Monto was proclaimed on land previously administered by the Shires of Eidsvold and Mundubbera. The town of Monto also briefly served as the administrative centre of Eidsvold.

On 15 March 2008, under the Local Government (Reform Implementation) Act 2007 passed by the Parliament of Queensland on 10 August 2007, the Shire of Monto merged with the Shires of Biggenden, Eidsvold, Gayndah, Mundubbera and Perry to form the North Burnett Region.

== Towns and localities ==
The Shire of Monto included the following settlements:

- Bancroft
- Bukali
- Cania
- Cannindah
- Coominglah
- Coominglah Forest
- Glenleigh
- Harrami
- Kalpowar
- Kapaldo
- Langley
- Monal
- Monto
- Moonford
- Mulgildie
- Mungungo
- Rawbelle
- Selene
- Splinter Creek
- Tellebang
- Three Moon
- Ventnor

== Chairmen ==
- 1964—1970: Lindsay Earle Hartwig

== Population ==
Year	Population
1933	3,514
1947	4,270
1954	4,458
1961	4,397
1966	4,155
1971	3,495
1976	3,228
1981	3,249
1986	3,266
1991	3,058
1996	2,922
2001	2,592
2006	2,577
