= Shire of Calliope =

Coordinates: 24°00′22″S 151°11′55″E

- Local government area
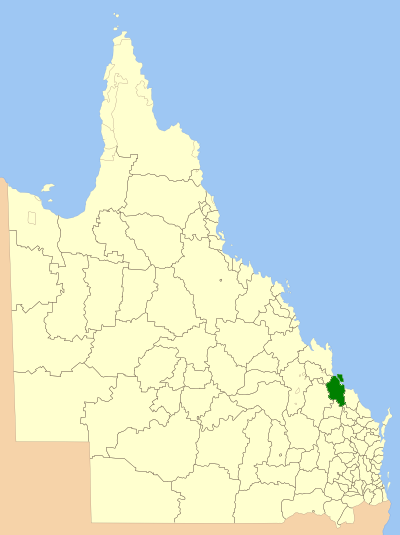
- Location within Queensland

- Country: Australia
- State: Queensland
- Region: Capricornia
- Council seat: Calliope

Area
  - Total: 5,875 km^{2} (2,268 sq mi)

Population
  - Total: 16,544 (2006 census)
  - Density: 2.8160/km^{2} (7.2934/sq mi)
- Website: Shire of Calliope
LGAs around Shire of Calliope
Fitzroy	Pacific Ocean	Gladstone
Banana	Shire of Calliope	Pacific Ocean
Monto	Kolan	Miriam Vale

The Shire of Calliope was a local government area in the Capricornia region of Queensland, Australia. It was centred on the town of Calliope.

== History ==
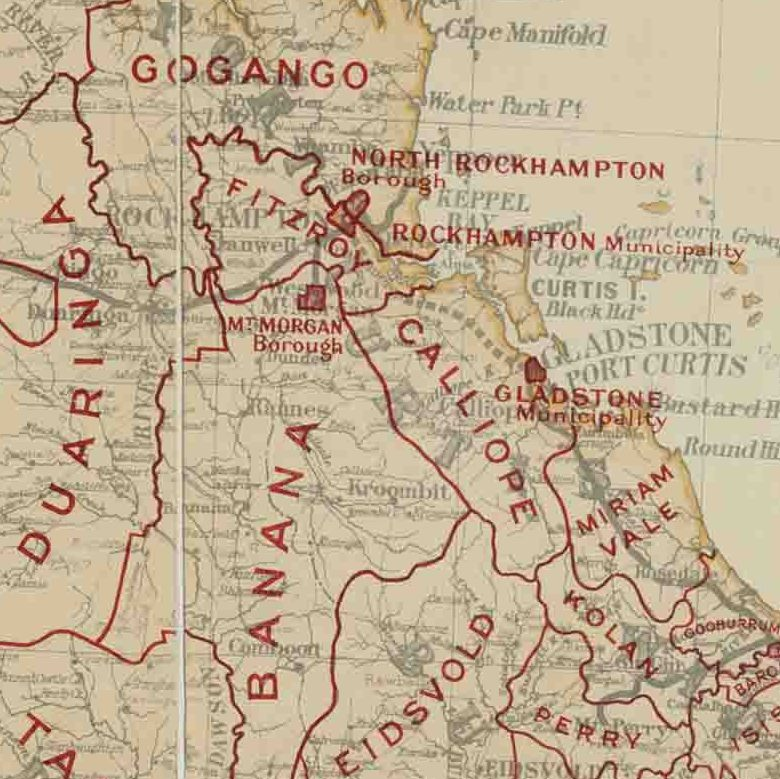
Map of Calliope Division and adjacent local government areas, March 1902

Calliope Division was created on 11 November 1879 as one of 74 divisions around Queensland under the Divisional Boards Act 1879 with a population of 1044.

On 7 January 1902 part of Calliope Division was separated to create Miriam Vale Division.

With the passage of the Local Authorities Act 1902, Calliope Division became the Shire of Calliope on 31 March 1903.

In 1927, the council hall was in Gladstone.

Following the report of the Local Government Reform Commission released in July 2007, three former local government areas:

- City of Gladstone
- Shire of Calliope
- Shire of Miriam Vale

were amalgamated to form Gladstone Region on 15 March 2008.

== Towns and localities ==
The Shire of Calliope included the following settlements:

Towns:

- Calliope (administrative centre)

Urban areas:

- Benaraby
- Boyne Island
- Tannum Sands

Rural townships:

- Ambrose
- Mount Larcom
- Raglan
- Yarwun
- Targinnie

Localities of The Boyne Valley:

- Builyan
- Many Peaks
- Nagoorin
- Ubobo

Other communities:

- Bracewell
- East End

== Chairpersons and mayors ==
- 1927: Frank Butler
- 1991 – 1995: Liz Cunningham
- 1995 – 2008: George Creed
