= Shire of Kolan =

Coordinates: 24°59′30.8″S 151°57′19.5″E

- Local government area
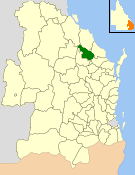
- Location within Queensland

- Country: Australia
- State: Queensland
- Region: Wide Bay–Burnett
- Established: 1879
- Council seat: Gin Gin

Area
  - Total: 2,650.6 km^{2} (1,023.4 sq mi)

Population
  - Total: 4,563 (2006 census)
  - Density: 1.72150/km^{2} (4.4587/sq mi)
- Website: Shire of Kolan
LGAs around Shire of Kolan
Calliope	Miriam Vale	Miriam Vale
Perry	Shire of Kolan	Burnett
Perry	Biggenden	Isis

The Shire of Kolan was a local government area located in the Wide Bay–Burnett region of Queensland, Australia, to the west of Bundaberg. The Shire, administered from the town of Gin Gin, covered an area of 2,650.6 square kilometres (1,023.4 sq mi), and existed as a local government entity from 1879 until 2008, when it was amalgamated with the City of Bundaberg and the Shires of Burnett and Isis to form the Bundaberg Region.

The major industries in the area include cattle and sugar cane.

== History ==
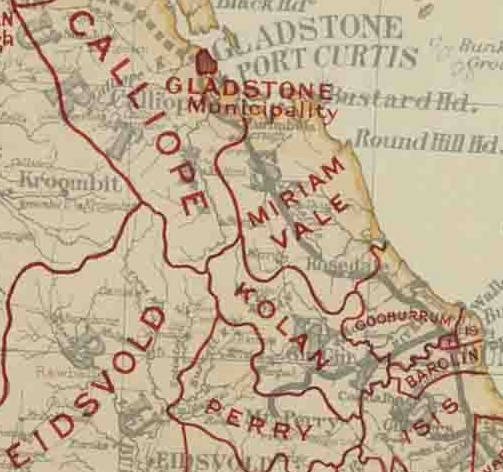
Map of Kolan Division and adjacent local government areas, March 1902

Kolan Division was created on 11 November 1879 as one of the original 74 divisions around Queensland under the Divisional Boards Act 1879 with a population of 1171.

On 28 January 1886, the region north of the Burnett River was excised from Kolan Division to create a separate Gooburrum Division.

With the passage of the Local Authorities Act 1902, Kolan Division became the Shire of Kolan on 31 March 1903.

On 15 March 2008, under the Local Government (Reform Implementation) Act 2007 passed by the Parliament of Queensland on 10 August 2007, the Shire of Kolan merged with the Shires of Burnett and Isis and the City of Bundaberg to form the Bundaberg Region.

== Towns and localities ==
The Shire of Kolan included the following settlements:

- Gin Gin
- Bullyard
- Bungadoo
- Kalpowar
- Maroondan
- McIlwraith
- Tirroan
- Wallaville

== Chairmen ==
- 1927: C. M. English

== Population ==
Year	Population
1933	2,941
1947	2,502
1954	2,502
1961	2,657
1966	2,614
1971	2,673
1976	2,684
1981	2,358
1986	2,649
1991	3,018
1996	4,196
2001	4,534
2006	4,638
