= Shire of Miriam Vale =

Coordinates: 24°19′43″S 151°33′43.4″E

- Local government area
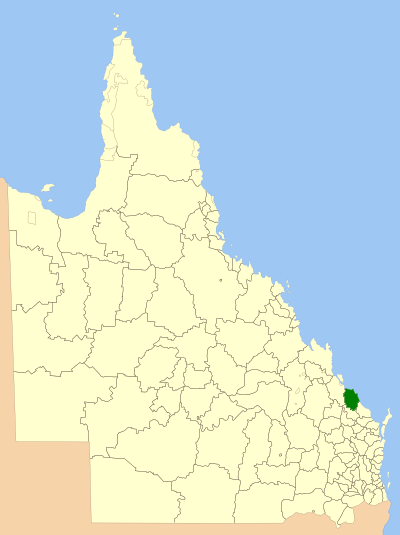
- Location within Queensland

- Country: Australia
- State: Queensland
- Council seat: Miriam Vale

Area
  - Total: 3,800 km^{2} (1,500 sq mi)

Population
  - Total: 5,216 (2006 census)
  - Density: 1.373/km^{2} (3.56/sq mi)
- Website: Shire of Miriam Vale
LGAs around Shire of Miriam Vale
Calliope	Pacific Ocean	Pacific Ocean
Calliope	Shire of Miriam Vale	Pacific Ocean
Kolan	Kolan	Burnett

The Shire of Miriam Vale was a local government area near Gladstone in Queensland, Australia. The administrative centre was the town of Miriam Vale.

== History ==
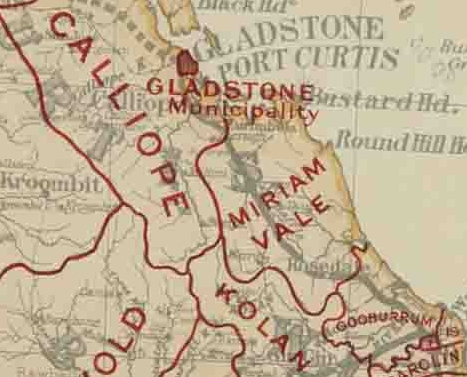
Map of Miriam Vale Division and adjacent local government areas, March 1902

Calliope Division was created on 11 November 1879 as one of 74 divisions around Queensland under the Divisional Boards Act 1879. On 7 January 1902, the Miriam Vale Division was separated from Calliope Division.

With the passage of the Local Authorities Act 1902, Miriam Vale Division became the Shire of Miriam Vale on 31 March 1903.

Following the report of the Local Government Reform Commission released in July 2007, three former local government areas:

- City of Gladstone
- Shire of Calliope
- Shire of Miriam Vale

were amalgamated to form Gladstone Region on 15 March 2008.

== Towns and localities ==
The Shire of Miriam Vale included the following settlements:

Towns:

- 1770
- Agnes Water
- Miriam Vale (administrative centre)
- Turkey Beach

Villages:

- Bororen
- Lowmead
- Rosedale

Other communities:

- Baffle Creek
- Deepwater

== Economy ==
The Shire of Miriam Vale was a sheep growing area, and also supported timber, beef and dairy cattle. Tourism was an emerging industry within the Shire.

== Chairmen ==
- 1927: G. G. Hales
