= City of Gladstone =

Coordinates: 23°50′55.36″S 151°15′35.30″E

- Local government area
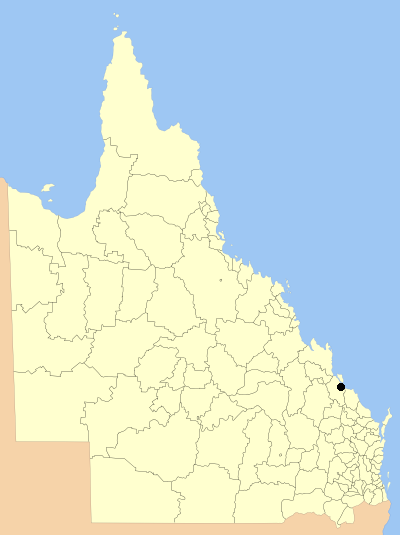
- Location within Queensland

- Country: Australia
- State: Queensland
- Council seat: Gladstone

Area
  - Total: 147 km^{2} (57 sq mi)

Population
  - Total: 29,085 (2006)
  - Density: 197.9/km^{2} (512.4/sq mi)
- Website: City of Gladstone
LGAs around City of Gladstone
Pacific Ocean	Pacific Ocean	Pacific Ocean
Calliope	City of Gladstone	Pacific Ocean
Calliope	Calliope	Pacific Ocean

The City of Gladstone is a former local government area in central Queensland, Australia. It covered the urban locality of Gladstone and parts of the surrounding area.

== History ==
Following the report of the Local Government Reform Commission released in July 2007, three former local government areas:

- City of Gladstone
- Shire of Calliope
- Shire of Miriam Vale

were amalgamated to form Gladstone Region on 15 March 2008.

== Economy ==
Being a port city, its local commerce is primarily industrial-based and include large-scale industrial plants include alumina refineries, aluminium smelting, heavy chemicals and shale oil.

== Facilities ==
=== Hospital ===
Gladstone does contain a hospital, providing a range of facilities including: Emergency, Outpatients, General Medicine and Surgery (including Day Surgery), basic Orthopaedics, Obstetrics and Gynaecology, Medical Imaging, Pharmacy, Pathology, Central Sterilising.

These services are limited, thus requiring referral to the closest major city (Rockhampton Hospital 110 kilometres (68 mi) away).

=== Art gallery ===
Gladstone has an art gallery run and owned by the Gladstone Regional Council.

=== Airport ===
Gladstone Regional Council has an airport. The Council took control of the assets of the Gladstone Airport which was previously operated by the Gladstone Calliope Aerodrome Board. This Board was a statutory body made up of representatives of the City of Gladstone and Shire of Calliope. It is currently being refurbished and provides both indirect and direct flights only to Brisbane Airport. These services are provided by Qantas Link and Strategic Airlines (as of April 2011).

== Mayors ==
- 1881: Walter Benjamin Prizeman
- 1904: Walter James Prizeman
- 1913: Walter James Prizeman (2nd time)
- 1914: Walter James Prizeman (3rd time)
- 1916: Walter James Prizeman (4th time)
- 1917: John Henry Kessell
- 1918: John Henry Kessell (2nd time)
- 1925 Edward Matthew Breslin
- 1927: Edward Matthew Breslin
- 1929–1930: W.H Ferris
- 1933–1941 : Edward Matthew Breslin
- 1941: Gideon George Dennis
- Thomas de Lacey Kellett (several terms prior to 1944), son of William Kellett
- 1946–1961 : John Francis (Jack) O'Malley
- 1979–1994 : Colin Brown
- 1994–2008: Peter Corones

== See also ==
- Gladstone, Queensland
