= Shire of Eidsvold =

Coordinates: 25°22′18.88″S 151°07′21.92″E

- Local government area
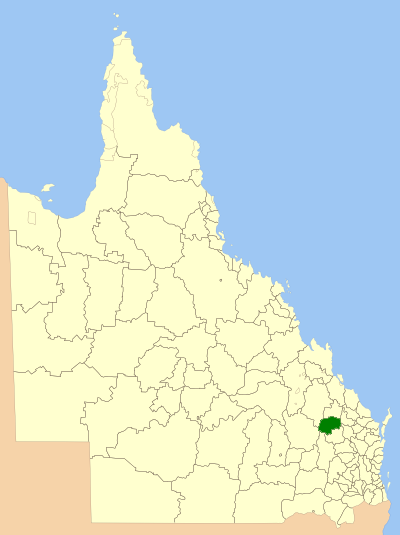
- Location within Queensland

- Country: Australia
- State: Queensland
- Region: Wide Bay–Burnett
- Established: 1890
- Council seat: Eidsvold

Area
  - Total: 4,809.4 km^{2} (1,856.9 sq mi)

Population
  - Total: 876 (2006 census)
  - Density: 0.18214/km^{2} (0.47175/sq mi)
- Website: Shire of Eidsvold
LGAs around Shire of Eidsvold
| Banana | Monto | Monto |
| Taroom | Shire of Eidsvold | Perry |
| Chinchilla | Mundubbera | Gayndah |

The Shire of Eidsvold was a local government area in the northern catchment of the Burnett River, Queensland, Australia. The shire covered an area of 4,809.4 square kilometres (1,856.9 sq mi), and existed as a local government area from 1890 until 2008, when it amalgamated with several other shires to form the North Burnett Region.

The major activities in the shire were beef cattle raising and forestry, and some irrigated properties existed along the Burnett and Nogo Rivers. Eidsvold was named after the Norwegian town of Eidsvoll, where the Norwegian declaration of freedom was signed in 1814.

The Eidsvold district is the self-proclaimed Beef Capital of the Burnett and is a hub for the regional cattle industry.

== History ==
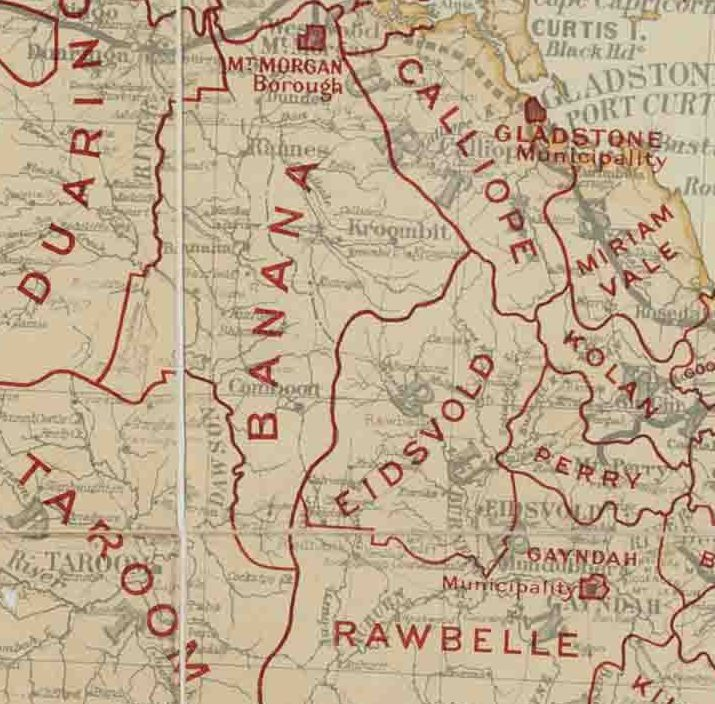
Map of Eidsvold Division and adjacent local government areas, March 1902

The Eidsvold Division was proclaimed on 25 January 1890, initially with a chairman and six councillors, and the first meeting took place on 14 May 1890.

With the passage of the Local Authorities Act 1902, Eidsvold Division became the Shire of Eidsvold on 31 March 1903. The original shire included both the towns of Eidsvold and Monto, and in the late 1920s, its administrative centre moved to Watt Street, Monto.

On 3 March 1932, an Order in Council dissolved the Shire of Eidsvold, and created the Shire of Monto from parts of Eidsvold and Mundubbera, and a new Shire of Eidsvold from parts of the old Eidsvold, Mundubbera and Perry. The new council had 5 members compared to 12 in the previous incarnation.

On 15 March 2008, under the Local Government (Reform Implementation) Act 2007 passed by the Parliament of Queensland on 10 August 2007, the Shire of Eidsvold merged with the Shires of Biggenden, Gayndah, Monto, Mundubbera and Perry to form the North Burnett Region.

== Towns and localities ==
The Shire of Eidsvold included the following settlements:

- Eidsvold
- Abercorn
- Ceratodus
- Wuruma Dam

== Chairmen ==
- 1880–1898: William McCord
- 1927: C. E. K. McCord

== Population ==
| Year | Population |
|---|---|
| 1933 | 1,475 |
| 1947 | 1,313 |
| 1954 | 1,311 |
| 1961 | 1,242 |
| 1966 | 1,702 |
| 1971 | 1,222 |
| 1976 | 1,231 |
| 1981 | 1,256 |
| 1986 | 1,212 |
| 1991 | 1,028 |
| 1996 | 970 |
| 2001 | 933 |
| 2006 | 876 |
