= William Parry-Okeden =

Australian explorer and police chief (1840–1926)

Commissioner William Parry-Okeden ISO
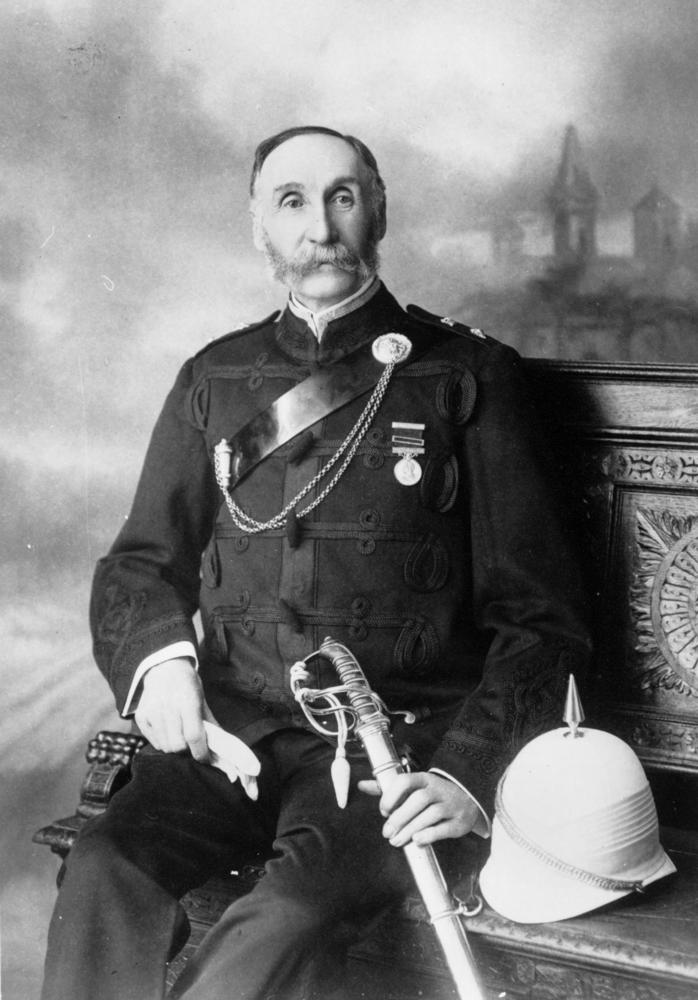
- William Parry-Okeden dressed in his military uniform, ca. 1870

Queensland Under-Colonial Secretary
- In office July 1889 – 30 June 1895

Commissioner of the Queensland Police
- In office 1 July 1895 – 1 April 1905
- Preceded by: David Thompson Seymour
- Succeeded by: William Geoffrey Cahill

Personal details
- Born: 13 May 1841 Snowy River, New South Wales, Australia
- Died: 30 August 1926 (aged 85) Brisbane, Queensland, Australia
- Resting place: Balmoral Cemetery, Brisbane
- Occupation: Police officer

William Edward Parry-Okeden ISO (13 May 1841 – 30 August 1926) was a public servant, Police Commissioner and Protector of Aborigines (1895-1903), and a horseman, in Queensland, Australia. He stood 6 ft 2 in (1.88 m) tall.

== Early life ==
William Edward Parry-Okeden was born on 13 May 1841, the son of David Parry-Okeden (c.1810–9 August 1895), a Royal Navy officer who had served during the Battle of Navarino, and Rosalie Caroline Dutton. The family had descended from the Okedens of Dorset, England, and the Parrys from Wales.

He was born at Maranumbela, his father's station, Snowy River, in the Monaro District of New South Wales. Education commenced at the Diocesan Grammar School. By the age of 14 he had already participated as a volunteer police officer in the Ballarat riots. Having served three years as an articled clerk to a solicitor in Melbourne, he relinquished the law and joined his father in squatting pursuits in Queensland in 1861, including managing the Burrandownan Station, the largest property in the Burnett district. With Richard W. Stuart, he explored the upper waters of the Dawson River, aged 22 in 1862.

== Public service career ==
Nine years later he was appointed to initiate the Border Customs, and entered the Civil Service as Inspector of the Border Patrol in December 1870. Having been employed as a police magistrate from 1872 to 1886, including far south-west Queensland including Cunnamulla and Charleville, Parry-Okeden acted for the next three years as immigration agent at Brisbane, receiving the appointment of Under-Colonial Secretary in July 1889. In 1887 he acted with Kinnaird Rose on an inquiry into gaol management in Queensland.

In response to the 1892 small pox epidemic, as Under-Colonial Secretary, Parry-Okeden organised health services, opened infection camps, and quarantine services. He was then involved with maintaining law and order of the maritime and 1894 shearer's strikes on the 1890s.

He served as police commissioner from 1 July 1895 to 1 April 1905. As Commissioner he oversaw the 'Gatton tragedy' in 1896 and the 'Kenniff affair' of 1902.

Parry-Okeden received an Imperial Service Order in June 1903. Parry-Okeden retired from the public service in 1905, aged 65.

With the royal visit of the Duke and Duchess of York, Parry-Okeden was the state and federal governments' Australasian coordinator.

He later became the chairman of a Royal Commission into the conditions of Papua, whose recommendations were adopted.

== Other interests ==
In 1868, Parry-Okden's horse Hermit won the first Queensland Derby run at Gayndah Racecourse.

== Personal life ==
William Parry-Okeden married (E)lizabeth Gertrude Wall in October 1873. She came from a West Indian family of planters in Barbadoes and Trinidad. Her great grandfather was a member of the Legislative Council of Barbadoes, when his great grandfather was governor of that colony.

With his wife, they had three surviving sons and four surviving daughters:

- Captain Uvedale Edward Parry-Okeden MC (1874–1961), serving at Gallipoli, later of Wells Station, Mundubbera, Queensland. He married Auburn Jessie May Hayes (–1964) in 1922;
- Charles Fitzmaurice Parry-Okeden (1878–1974), later of 'Glen Haughton', Taroom, Queensland
- Captain (H)erbert David Parry-Okeden (1889–), formerly of the Royal Flying Corps then Australian Flying Corps, later of 'Bungilburra', Chinchilla, Queensland;
- Hilda Beatrice Parry-Okeden (1880–), who later married Dr (H)ubert Roger Cope, settling in Goulburn, New South Wales;
- Rosalie Gertrude Parry-Okeden (1875–1950), in 1902 marrying Harry Richardson Pockley, 'Redlands', Corinda, Queensland;
- Evelyn Constance Parry-Okeden (–1980). On 17 February 1912 she married a distant cousin, Edmund Robert Parry-Okeden, in St Andrew's Cathedral, Sydney, before moving to England; and
- Violet Vivian Parry-Okeden (1883–1952), who later married Charles Dudley de Burgh Persse, of Tabragalba, Beaudesert, Queensland.

The family lived at Hawthorne, Bulimba, before they moved in January 1897 to the spacious residence of 'Delamore', 115 Turner Road, Kedron, Brisbane. His wife died in July 1918. In his last few years, he lived with his daughter Rosalie Pockley and her husband at Redcliffe.

Following injuries after being struck by a motor car, Parry-Okeden died on 30 August 1926 in Brisbane and was buried in Balmoral Cemetery.

He was subject of a 1927 book A son of Australia: Memories of W. E. Parry-Okeden, I.S.O., 1840–1926 by Brisbane journalist Harry C. Perry.
