= Shire of Perry =

Coordinates: 25°10′45.4″S 151°38′32.8″E

- Local government area
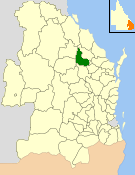
- Location within Queensland

- Country: Australia
- State: Queensland
- Region: Wide Bay-Burnett
- Established: 1880
- Council seat: Mount Perry

Area
  - Total: 2,357.7 km^{2} (910.3 sq mi)

Population
  - Total: 445 (2006 census)
  - Density: 0.18874/km^{2} (0.4888/sq mi)
- Website: Shire of Perry
LGAs around Shire of Perry
Monto	Monto	Kolan
Eidsvold	Shire of Perry	Kolan
Gayndah	Gayndah	Biggenden

The Shire of Perry was a local government area in the northern catchment of the Burnett River, Queensland, Australia. The Shire covered an area of 2,357.7 square kilometres (910.3 sq mi), and existed as a local government area from 1880 until 2008, when it amalgamated with several other shires to form the North Burnett Region.

Its administrative centre was the town of Mount Perry.

== History ==
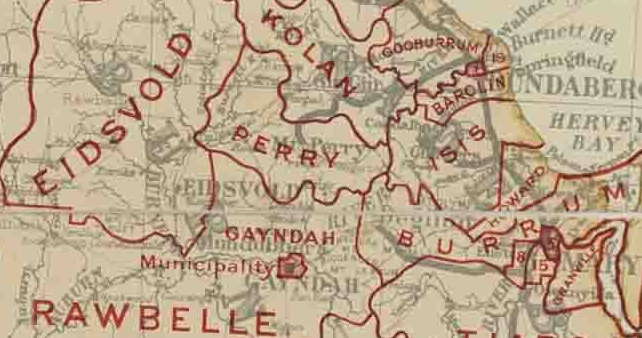
Map of Perry Division and adjacent local government areas, March 1902

The Perry Division was one of the original divisions created under the Divisional Boards Act 1879 with a population of 1664. It held its first meeting on 6 March 1880.

With the passage of the Local Authorities Act 1902, Perry Division became the Shire of Perry on 31 March 1903.

On 15 March 2008, under the Local Government (Reform Implementation) Act 2007 passed by the Parliament of Queensland on 10 August 2007, the Shire of Perry merged with the Shires of Biggenden, Eidsvold, Gayndah, Monto and Mundubbera to form the North Burnett Region.

== Towns and localities ==
The Shire of Perry included the following settlement:

- Mount Perry

== Population ==
Year	Population
1933	795
1947	628
1954	496
1961	455
1966	374
1971	376
1976	304
1981	309
1986	310
1991	374
1996	351
2001	426
2006	445

== Chairmen and mayors ==
- 1902—1933: Robert Hodnett
- 1933: William John Maynard
- 2008: Joy Jensen

Joy Jensen was the last mayor of the Shire of Perry. Despite leading the smallest of the six North Burnett councils, she won the mayoralty of the new North Burnett Region at the elections on 15 March 2008.
