= Shire of Gayndah =

Coordinates: 25°37′29.53″S 151°36′28.53″E

- Local government area
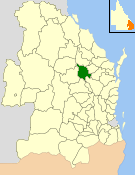
- Location within Queensland

- Country: Australia
- State: Queensland
- Region: Wide Bay–Burnett
- Established: 1866
- Council seat: Gayndah

Area
  - Total: 2,709.3 km^{2} (1,046.1 sq mi)

Population
  - Total: 2,911 (2006 census)
  - Density: 1.07445/km^{2} (2.7828/sq mi)
- Website: Shire of Gayndah
LGAs around Shire of Gayndah
Eisdvold	Perry	Biggenden
Mundubbera	Shire of Gayndah	Biggenden
Wondai	Kilkivan	Biggenden

The Shire of Gayndah was a local government area located in the northern catchment of the Burnett River, Queensland, Australia. The shire covered an area of 2,709.3 square kilometres (1,046.1 sq mi), and existed as a local government area from 1866 until 2008, when it amalgamated with several other shires to form the North Burnett Region.

Major activities in the shire included citrus production, beef and timber.

== History ==
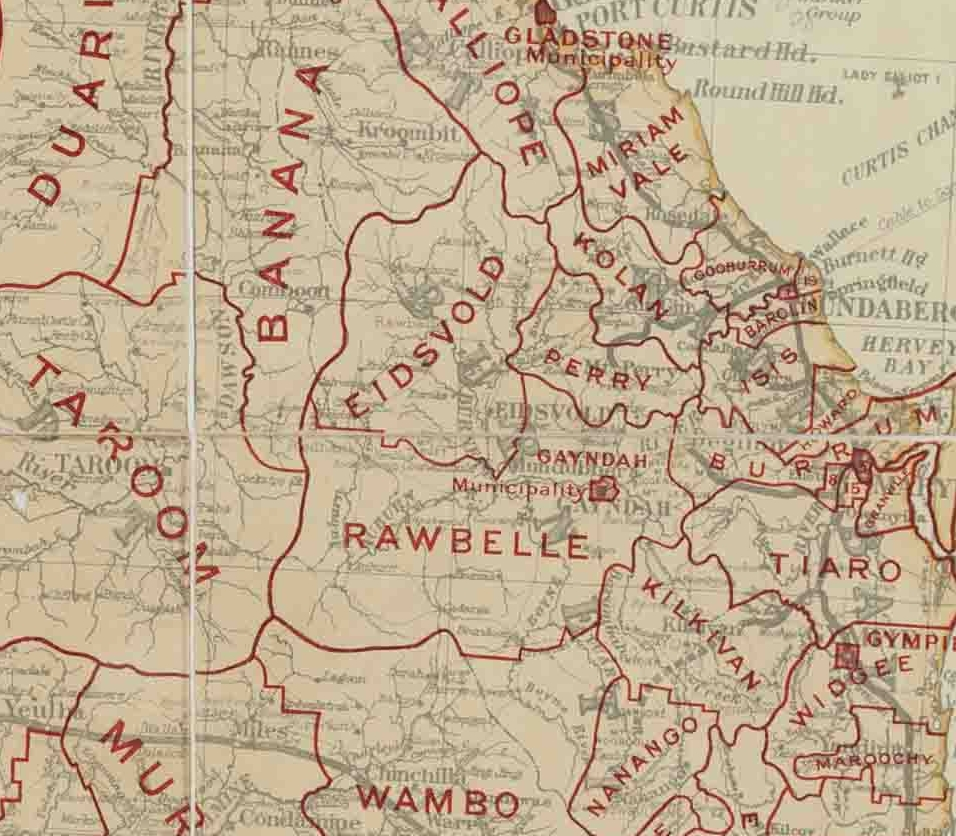
Map of Rawbelle Division and adjacent local government areas, March 1902

The first local government in the area was the Borough of Gayndah, serving the town of Gayndah, which was created on 28 November 1866 under the Municipal Corporations Act 1864. Under the Divisional Boards Act 1879, the Rawbelle Division was created on 11 November 1879 to serve the surrounding rural area with a population of 755. The headquarters of the Rawbelle Division was in the town of Gayndah and the first meeting of the divisional board was held on 29 March 1880 and the first elected chairman was Berkeley Moreton, who would later inherit the title Earl of Ducie.

On 31 March 1903, following the enactment of the Local Authorities Act 1902, the Borough of Gayndah became the Town of Gayndah and Rawbelle Division became Shire of Rawbelle.

The Shire of Rawbelle was renamed Shire of Gayndah on 17 March 1923, and on 24 May 1924 the Town of Gayndah was amalgamated into the Shire of Gayndah.

On 15 March 2008, under the Local Government (Reform Implementation) Act 2007 passed by the Parliament of Queensland on 10 August 2007, the Shire of Gayndah merged with the Shires of Eidsvold, Biggenden, Monto, Mundubbera and Perry to form the North Burnett Region.

== Chairmen ==
- 1880 Berkeley Moreton, 4th Earl of Ducie
- 1917: H. E. M. Leggett
- 1927: H. E. M. Leggett

H. E. M. Leggett was chairman of the shire for 25 years.

== Towns and localities ==
The Shire of Gayndah included the following settlements:

- Gayndah
- Ban Ban Springs
- Binjour
- Byrnestown
- Gooroolba
- Ideraway
- Wetheron

== Population ==
Year	Population
1879	755
1933	3,760
1947	3,407
1954	3,352
1961	3,400
1966	3,182
1971	3,107
1976	2,814
1981	2,859
1986	2,887
1991	2,856
1996	2,916
2001	2,894
2006	2,911
