= Town of Gayndah =

Local government area of Queensland, Australia

Coordinates: 25.6242°S 151.609°E

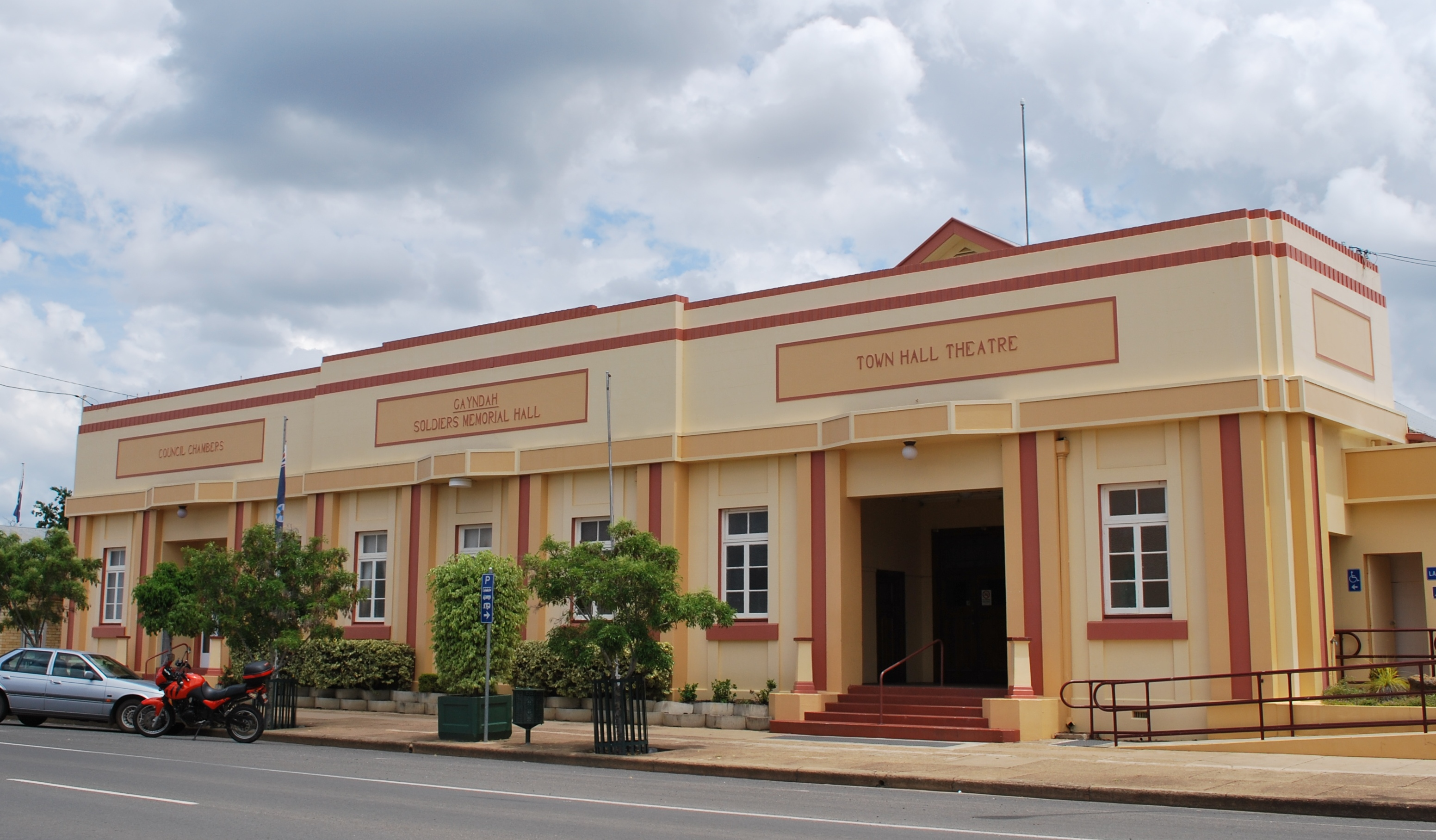
Gayndah Town Hall, 2008

The Town of Gayndah is a former local government area in the Wide Bay–Burnett area in Queensland, Australia, centred on Gayndah. It existed from 1876 to 1924.

== History ==
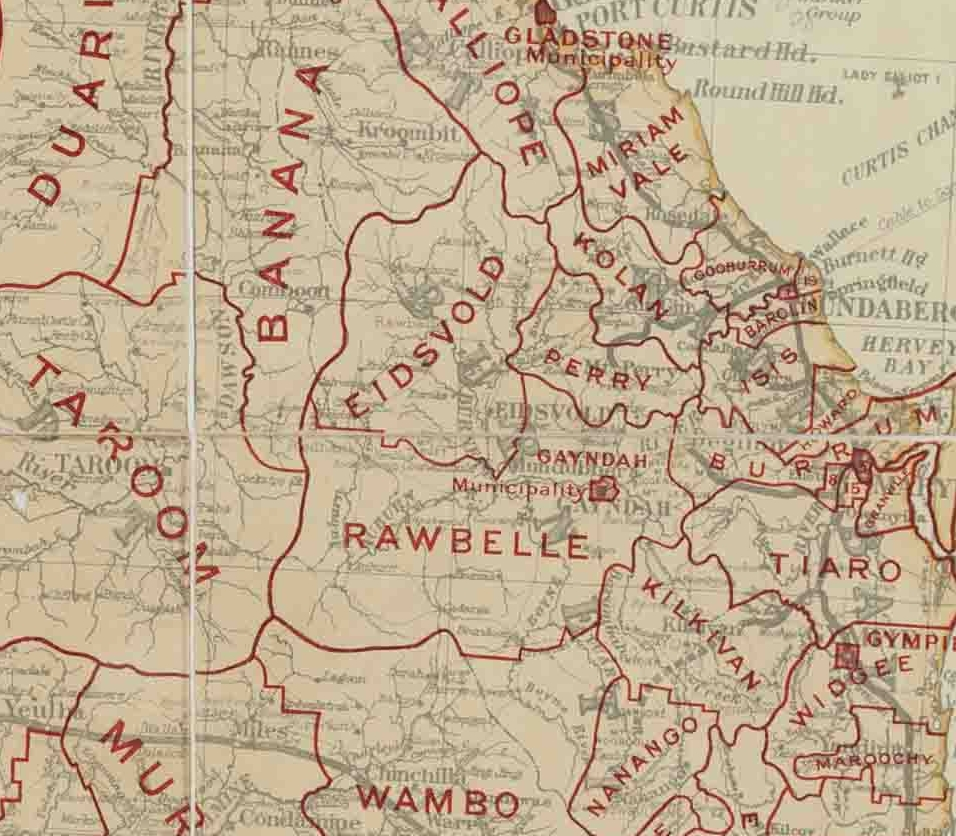
Map of Borough of Gayndah and adjacent local government areas, March 1902

On 3 April 1866, Gayndah was established as a separate municipality, the Borough of Gayndah, under the Municipal Institutions Act 1864.

With the passage of the Local Authorities Act 1902, the Borough of Gayndah became the Town of Gayndah on 31 March 1903.

On 24 May 1924, the Town of Gayndah was abolished and absorbed into the Shire of Gayndah.

== Mayors ==
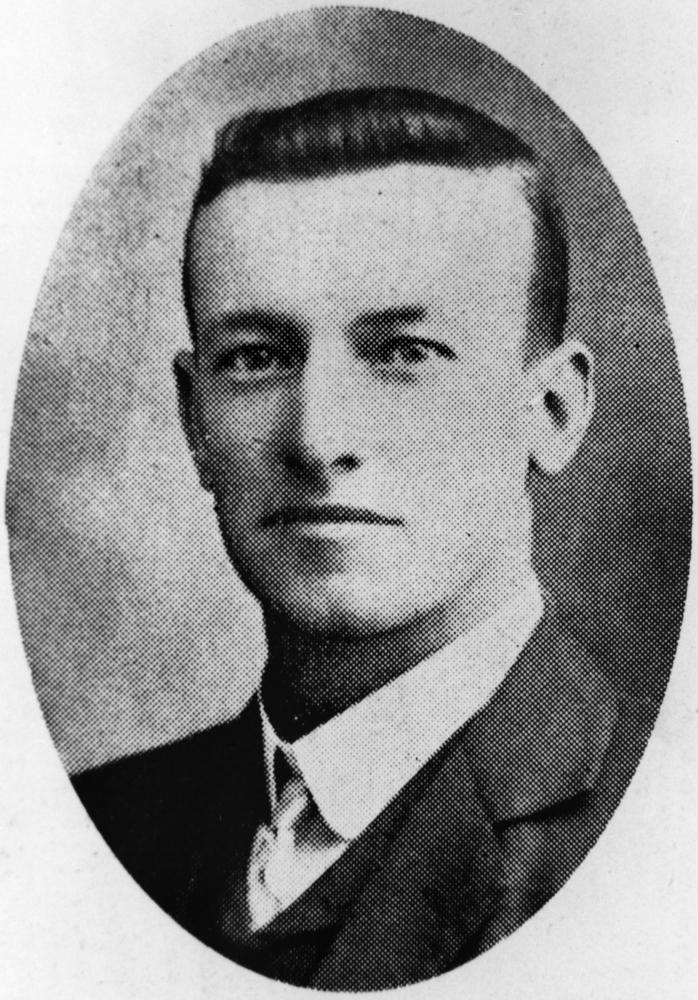
M. C. Stephenson, mayor of Gayndah in 1909

The following men were the mayor of Gayndah:

- 1880: Miller
- 1884: J.J.Cadell
- 1885: Cornwall
- 1887: Seeney
- 1898: Patrick McNamara
- 1899: Patrick McNamara
- 1900: Walker
- 1909: M. C. Stephenson
