= Brooweena War Memorial =

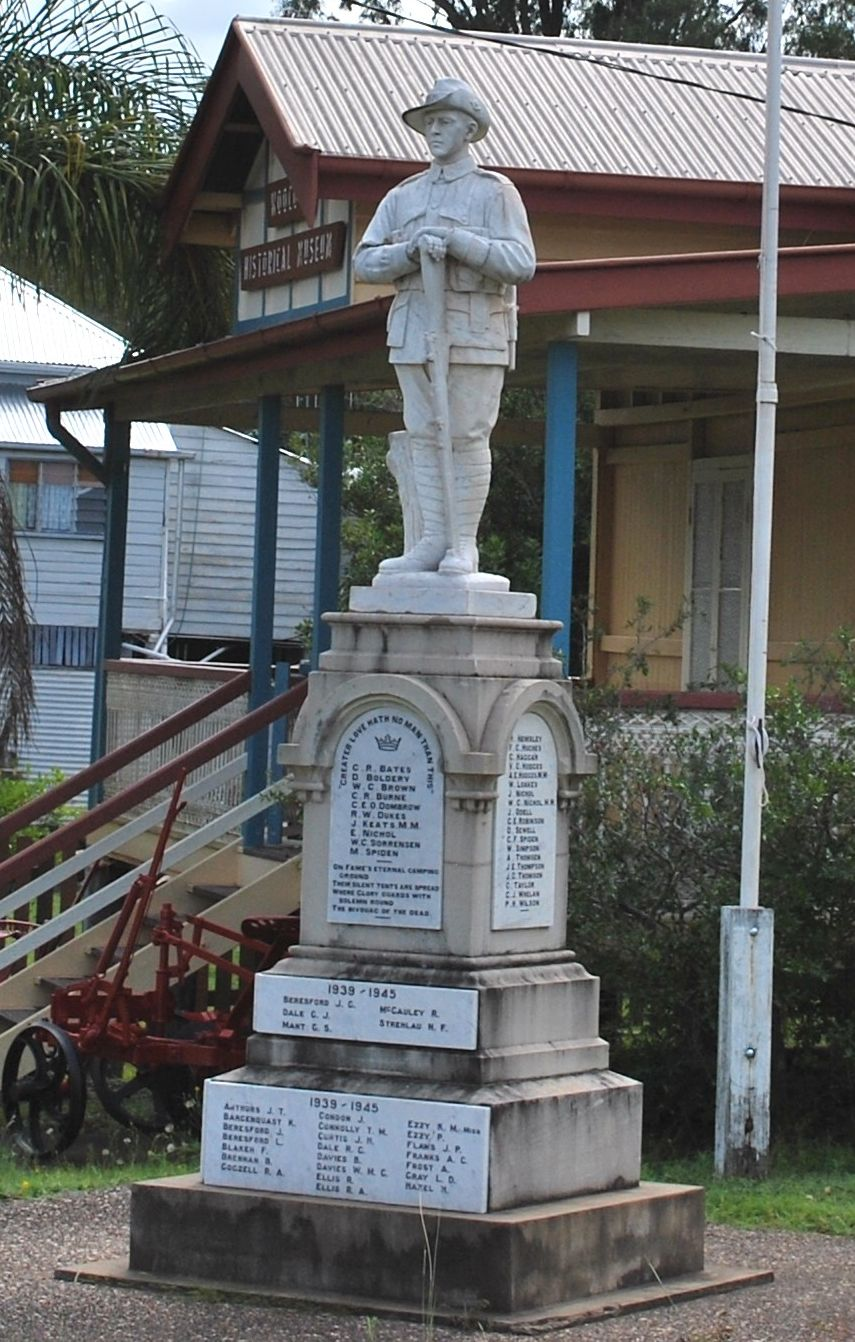
- Brooweena War Memorial, 2008

- Location within Queensland Location within Australia
- 25.6006°S 152.2628°E
- Location: Smith Crescent, Brooweena, Fraser Coast Region, Queensland, Australia

History
- Design period: 1919 - 1930s (interwar period)
- Built: 1922

Queensland Heritage Register
- Official name: Brooweena War Memorial
- Type: state heritage (built)
- Designated: 21 October 1992
- Reference no.: 600969
- Significant period: 1922- (social, fabric); 1922 (historical)
- Significant components: memorial - soldier statue, commemorative plaque
- Builders: F W Webb

Brooweena War Memorial is a heritage-listed memorial at Smith Crescent, Brooweena, Fraser Coast Region, Queensland, Australia. It was built in 1922 by F W Webb. It was added to the Queensland Heritage Register on 21 October 1992.

== History ==
The Brooweena War Memorial was erected by the residents of the Woocoo Shire in late 1922. It is not known who designed the monument but it was produced by Maryborough monumental masonry firm F W Webb. The marble and sandstone memorial honours the 39 local men who served during the First World War including the 10 fallen. A later set of plates records the 43 local men and women who served in the Second World War.

The strength of Brooweena's patriotic support during the First World War was remarkable. It funded an ambulance for France and has another memorial (a privately funded bridge) south of the town. The size of the digger memorial is large in comparison to the size of the town.

Australia, and Queensland in particular, had few civic monuments before the First World War. The memorials erected in its wake became our first national monuments, recording the devastating impact of the war on a young nation. Australia lost 60 000 from a population of about 4 million, representing one in five of those who served. No previous or subsequent war has made such an impact on the nation.

Even before the end of the war, memorials became a spontaneous and highly visible expression of national grief. To those who erected them, they were as sacred as grave sites, substitute graves for the Australians whose bodies lay in battlefield cemeteries in Europe and the Middle East. British policy decreed that the Empire war dead were to be buried where they fell. The word "cenotaph", commonly applied to war memorials at the time, literally means "empty tomb".

Australian war memorials are distinctive in that they commemorate not only the dead. Australians were proud that their first great national army, unlike other belligerent armies, was composed entirely of volunteers, men worthy of honour whether or not they made the supreme sacrifice. Many memorials honour all who served from a locality, not just the dead, providing valuable evidence of community involvement in the war. Such evidence is not readily obtainable from military records, or from state or national listings, where names are categorised alphabetically or by military unit.

Australian war memorials are also valuable evidence of imperial and national loyalties, at the time, not seen as conflicting; the skills of local stonemasons, metalworkers and architects; and of popular taste. In Queensland, the soldier statue was the popular choice of memorial, whereas the obelisk predominated in the southern states, possibly a reflection of Queensland's larger working-class population and a lesser involvement of architects.

Many of the First World War monuments have been updated to record local involvement in later conflicts, and some have fallen victim to unsympathetic re-location and repair.

Although there are many different types of memorials in Queensland, the digger statue is the most common. It was the most popular choice of communities responsible for erecting the memorials, embodying the ANZAC Spirit and representing the qualities of the ideal Australian: loyalty, courage, youth, innocence and masculinity. The digger was a phenomenon peculiar to Queensland, perhaps due to the fact that other states had followed Britain's lead and established Advisory Boards made up of architects and artists, prior to the erection of war memorials. The digger statue was not highly regarded by artists and architects who were involved in the design of relatively few Queensland memorials.

Most statues were constructed by local masonry firms, although some were by artists or imported.

The origin of this digger memorial is unclear. The pedestal is of a style not found elsewhere in Queensland and the inscription is also considered to be unusual.

The monument originally stood in front of St Mary's Church of England about three miles from Brooweena on the Maryborough-Biggenden Road in Teebar (now within Boompa). It was unveiled there on Saturday 6 January 1923 by Major-General Thomas William Glasgow. Prompted by fears of vandalism, it was moved to its present location in late 1992.

== Description ==
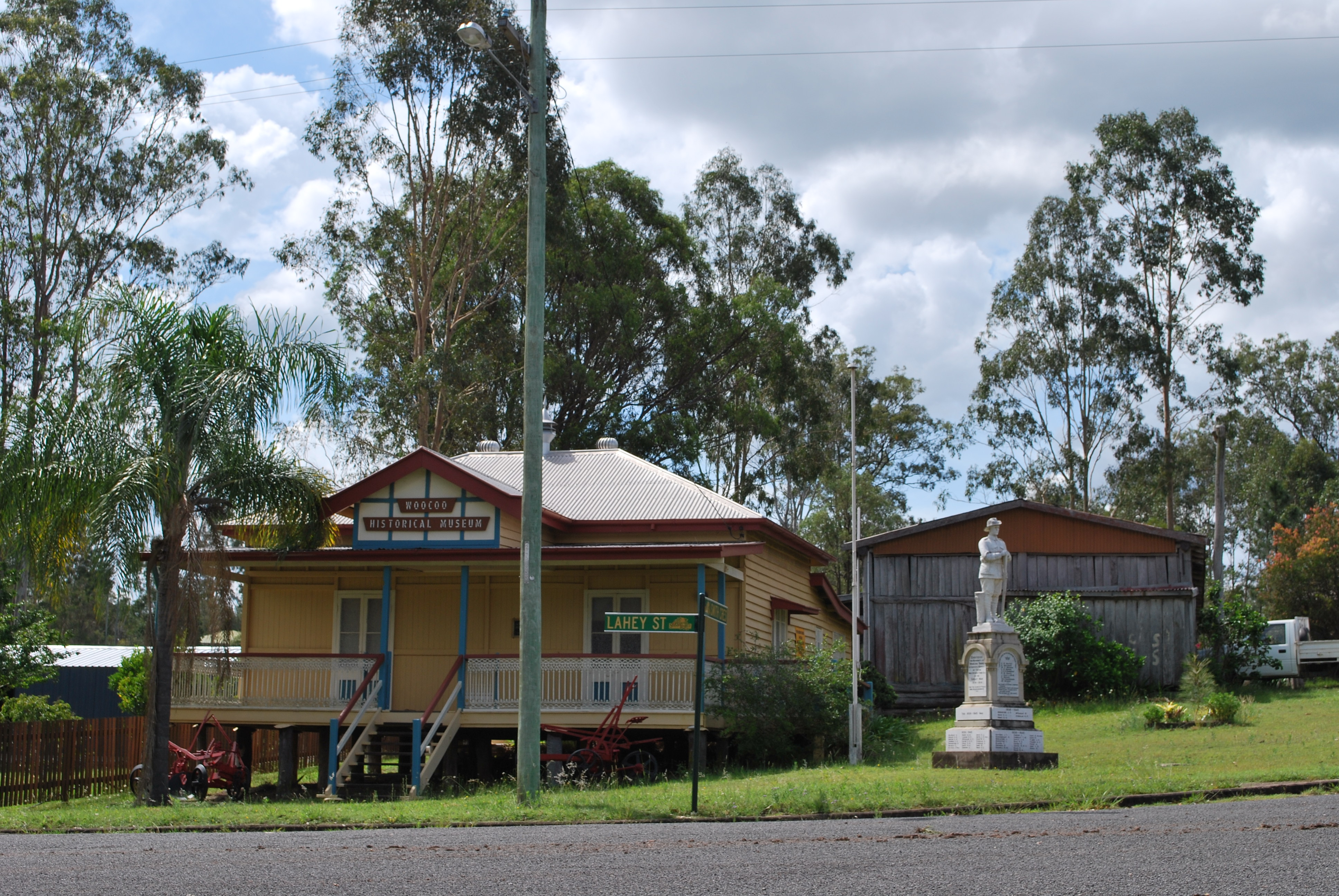
War memorial in the grounds of the Woocoo Historical Museum, 2008

The First World War Memorial is situated in the grounds of The Woocoo Historical Museum.

It comprises an unusually designed pedestal surmounted by a digger statue.

The sandstone memorial sits on a concrete base step. Above this are three smooth-faced sandstone steps, two of which are the same width, separated by a thinner step. On the front face of the two larger steps are leaded marble plaques bearing the names of the men and women who served in the Second World War. The uppermost step is capped with a cyma recta moulding from which the square pedestal projects. Marble plates are located on the side and front faces of the pedestal and bear an inscription in the form of a verse, the names of the 10 local men who fell and the 39 others who served in the First World War. Semi-circular hood-moulds are located over the top of each plaque. A series of moulded steps sit above this, on which the digger statue stands.

The digger statue stands with his head erect and his hands resting on top of a rifle which is in the reversed position and rests on the top of the right boot. A tree stump support is located behind and to the right side of the statue.

== Heritage listing ==
Brooweena War Memorial was listed on the Queensland Heritage Register on 21 October 1992 having satisfied the following criteria.

The place is important in demonstrating the evolution or pattern of Queensland's history.

War Memorials are important in demonstrating the pattern of Queensland's history as they are representative of a recurrent theme that involved most communities throughout the state. They provide evidence of an era of widespread Australian patriotism and nationalism, particularly during and following the First World War.

The place demonstrates rare, uncommon or endangered aspects of Queensland's cultural heritage.

This particular statue is of aesthetic value, both for its prominence as a landmark in the town and for its unusual pedestal design and inscription.

The place is important in demonstrating the principal characteristics of a particular class of cultural places.

The monuments manifest a unique documentary record and are demonstrative of popular taste in the inter-war period.

Erected in 1922, the memorial at Brooweena demonstrates the principal characteristics of a commemorative structure erected as an enduring record of a major historical event. This is achieved through the use of appropriate materials and design elements. As a digger statue it is representative of the most popular form of memorial in Queensland.

The place is important because of its aesthetic significance.

This particular statue is of aesthetic value, both for its prominence as a landmark in the town and for its unusual pedestal design and inscription.

The place has a strong or special association with a particular community or cultural group for social, cultural or spiritual reasons.

It has a strong association with the community as evidence of the impact of a major historic event. This memorial is also significant as evidence of the extraordinary patriotism of the people of Brooweena.
