= Glenbar, Queensland =

Glenbar
- Suburb
- Interactive map of Glenbar
- Coordinates: 25.7497°S 152.3402°E
- Country: Australia
- State: Queensland
- LGA: Fraser Coast Region
- Location: 48.4 km (30.1 mi) N of Kilkivan; 59.3 km (36.8 mi) SSE of Biggenden; 68 km (42 mi) SW of Maryborough; 83.1 km (51.6 mi) SW of Hervey Bay; 291 km (181 mi) N of Brisbane

Government
  - State electorate: Maryborough
  - Federal division: Wide Bay

Area
  - Total: 128.5 km^{2} (49.6 sq mi)

Population
  - Total: 0 (2021 census)
  - Density: 0.000/km^{2} (0.000/sq mi)
- Time zone: UTC+10:00 (AEST)
- Postcode: 4620
Suburbs around Glenbar
Woocoo	Woocoo	St Mary
Gigoomgan	Glenbar	Mount Urah
Marodian	Marodian	Mount Urah

Glenbar is a rural locality in the Fraser Coast Region, Queensland, Australia. In the 2021 census, Glenbar had "no people or a very low population".

== Geography ==
Glenbar State Forest and St Mary State Forest are in the north of the locality. Apart from these protected areas, the land use is grazing on native vegetation.

== History ==
In 1877, two parcels of land consisting of 5,760 acres (2,330 ha) and 23,680 acres (9,580 ha) were resumed from the Glenbar pastoral run to establish smaller farms. The land was offered for selection on 17 April 1877.

Glenbar Provisional School opened circa April 1881. It closed circa 1892.

== Demographics ==
In the 2016 census, Glenbar had a population of 11 people.

In the 2021 census, Glenbar had "no people or a very low population".

== Education ==
There are no schools in Glenbar. The nearest government primary schools are Brooweena State School in Brooweena to the north-west, Gundiah State School in Gundiah to the east, and Woolooga State School in Woolooga to the south-east. The nearest government secondary schools are Kilkivan State School (to Year 10) in Kilkivan to the south, Biggenden State School (to Year 10) in Biggenden to the north-west, and Aldridge State High School (to Year 12) in Maryborough to the north-east. However, students in parts of Glenbar may be to distant to attend these secondary schools; the alternatives are distance education and boarding school.
