= Calgoa, Queensland =

Calgoa
- Suburb
- Interactive map of Calgoa
- Coordinates: 25.8677°S 152.2469°E
- Country: Australia
- State: Queensland
- LGA: Fraser Coast Region
- Location: 35.5 km (22.1 mi) N of Kilkivan; 65.0 km (40.4 mi) NW of Gympie; 95.0 km (59.0 mi) SW of Maryborough; 124 km (77 mi) SW of Hervey Bay; 240 km (150 mi) NNW of Brisbane

Government
  - State electorate: Maryborough
  - Federal division: Wide Bay

Area
  - Total: 57.0 km^{2} (22.0 sq mi)

Population
  - Total: 14 (2021 census)
  - Density: 0.246/km^{2} (0.636/sq mi)
- Time zone: UTC+10:00 (AEST)
- Postcode: 4570
Suburbs around Calgoa
| Gigoomgan | Gigoomgan | Marodian |
| Tansey | Calgoa | Marodian |
| Mudlo | Mudlo | Woolooga |

Calgoa is a rural locality in the Fraser Coast Region, Queensland, Australia. In the 2021 census, Calgoa had a population of 14 people.

== Geography ==
Calgoa Creek enters the locality from the south-west (Mudlo), meanders through the locality before forming the north-eastern boundary of the locality, exiting to the east (Marodian). It is ultimately a tributary of the Mary River.

Calgoa Road enters the locality from the east (Marodian).

Two sections of Grongah National Park are in the south-west and south of the locality, extending into neighbouring Tansey and Mudlo and beyond. Apart from these protected areas, the land use is grazing on native vegetation.

== History ==
Calgoa Provisional School opened as a part-time school (meaning a teacher was shared between the two schools) on 29 January 1935, but closed on 18 April 1935. It reopened on 10 April 1938. In 1952, it became Calgoa State School, relocating to a new 3-acre (1.2 ha) site donated by Mr V. G. Turner with a school building relocated from the then-closed Brooyar State School. It closed in December 1953. Its final location was north of Thunder Creek Road (approx 25.8786°S 152.24637°E).

== Demographics ==
In the 2016 census, Calgoa had a population of 9 people.

In the 2021 census, Calgoa had a population of 14 people.

== Education ==
There are no schools in Calgoa. The nearest government primary schools are Brooweena State School in Brooweena to the north and Woolooga State School in neighbouring Woolooga to the south-east. The nearest government secondary school is Kilkivan State School (to Year 10) in Kilkivan to the south. There are no nearby schools providing education to Year 12; the alternatives are distance education and boarding school.
