= War Memorial Bridge, Brooweena =

- Location within Queensland Location within Australia
- 25.7378°S 152.2358°E
- Location: Brooweena-Woolooga Road, Brooweena, Fraser Coast Region, Queensland, Australia

History
- Design period: 1919 - 1930s (interwar period)
- Built: 1921

Site notes
- Architect: Lawrence Stevens Smith

Queensland Heritage Register
- Official name: War Memorial Bridge
- Type: state heritage (built)
- Designated: 21 October 1992
- Reference no.: 600968
- Significant period: 1920s (fabric); 1921-1972 (historical use as bridge)
- Significant components: pier/s (bridge), memorial - cairn, memorial - plaque, memorial - pillar/s
- Builders: Frederick William Webb

War Memorial Bridge is a heritage-listed memorial bridge at Brooweena-Woolooga Road, Brooweena, Fraser Coast Region, Queensland, Australia. It was designed by Lawrence Stevens Smith and built in 1921 by Frederick William Webb. It was added to the Queensland Heritage Register on 21 October 1992.

== History ==
The Brooweena War Memorial Bridge was officially opened on 21 May 1921 by local clergyman the Rev Hardingham. Mrs A Brown, whose son was among the fallen, performed the unveiling of the honour roll. The memorial honours the 9 local men who fell during the First World War.

Australia, and Queensland in particular, had few civic monuments before the First World War. The memorials erected in its wake became our first national monuments, recording the devastating impact of the war on a young nation. Australia lost 60 000 from a population of about 4 million, representing one in five of those who served. No previous or subsequent war has made such an impact on the nation.

Even before the end of the war, memorials became a spontaneous and highly visible expression of national grief. To those who erected them, they were as sacred as grave sites, substitute graves for the Australians whose bodies lay in battlefield cemeteries in Europe and the Middle East. British policy decreed that the Empire war dead were to be buried where they fell. The word "cenotaph", commonly applied to war memorials at the time, literally means "empty tomb".

Australian war memorials are distinctive in that they commemorate not only the dead. Australians were proud that their first great national army, unlike other belligerent armies, was composed entirely of volunteers, men worthy of honour whether or not they made the supreme sacrifice. Many memorials honour all who served from a locality, not just the dead, providing valuable evidence of community involvement in the war. Such evidence is not readily obtainable from military records, or from state or national listings, where names are categorised alphabetically or by military unit.

Australian war memorials are also valuable evidence of imperial and national loyalties, at the time, not seen as conflicting; the skills of local stonemasons, metalworkers and architects; and of popular taste. In Queensland, the soldier statue was the popular choice of memorial, whereas the obelisk predominated in the southern states, possibly a reflection of Queensland's larger working-class population and a lesser involvement of architects.

Many of the First World War monuments have been updated to record local involvement in later conflicts, and some have fallen victim to unsympathetic re-location and repair.

Although there were many different types of memorials throughout Queensland, this is the only known example of a memorial bridge. It was designed and funded by Lawrence Stevens Smith of Mount Joseph station and, apart from the masonry piers, was constructed by his station hands, some of whom were returned soldiers. The masonry work was carried out by F W Webb of Maryborough.

Although the Smiths lost no sons in the First World War, they still wished to make their own commemorative gesture. Upon completion of the bridge, it was handed over to the Woocoo Shire Council. This is indicative of the strength of Brooweena's patriotic support during the First World War. The residents of the town and surrounding district funded an ambulance in France and another memorial (the Brooweena War Memorial) in the form of a digger statue is located in the town.

The bridge remained in use until a new structure was built in 1972. Shortly after this date, Mr Smith jnr erected a commemorative cairn explaining the significance of the bridge. It remains as a local attraction within the area.

== Description ==
The First World War Memorial Bridge is located 21 kilometres (13 mi) south of Brooweena on the Brooweena-Woolooga Road. Apart from the memorial pillars, it is a typical country bridge located in a treed landscape. It is constructed of timber and is supported by piers to form a slight arch over a small creek. A simple white painted timber balustrade runs between the pairs of pillars located at either end.

The white painted sandstone pillars sit on stepped bases and have pedimented entablatures. On the approach side of each pillar are leaded marble plaques. Those at the northern approach bear the names of the nine local men who fell and the theatres of war where they died on one side, and the names of the 38 local soldiers who returned on the other. The pillars at the southern approach display the dates of the First World War.

== Heritage listing ==
The War Memorial Bridge at Brooweena was listed on the Queensland Heritage Register on 21 October 1992 having satisfied the following criteria.

The place is important in demonstrating the evolution or pattern of Queensland's history.

War Memorials are important in demonstrating the pattern of Queensland's history as they are representative of a recurrent theme that involved most communities throughout the state. They provide evidence of an era of widespread Australian patriotism and nationalism, particularly during and following the First World War. The monuments manifest a unique documentary record and are demonstrative of popular taste in the inter-war period. Opened in 1921, the memorial bridge at Brooweena was erected as an enduring record of a major historical event.

The place demonstrates rare, uncommon or endangered aspects of Queensland's cultural heritage.

It is rare as the only known privately erected memorial bridge in Queensland and possibly in Australia. The use of a bridge as a memorial to the First World War is uncommon in Queensland. There is only one other known example, however, it was publicly erected.

The place is important in demonstrating the principal characteristics of a particular class of cultural places.

It is rare as the only known privately erected memorial bridge in Queensland and possibly in Australia. The use of a bridge as a memorial to the First World War is uncommon in Queensland. There is only one other known example, however, it was publicly erected.

The place has a strong or special association with a particular community or cultural group for social, cultural or spiritual reasons.

The Bridge has a strong and continuing association with the community as evidence of the impact of a major historic event. This memorial is of particular significance as evidence of the extraordinary patriotism of the people of Brooweena and specifically with the Smith family who were responsible for its construction.
