= Malarga, Queensland =

Malarga
- Suburb
- Interactive map of Malarga
- Coordinates: 25.7775°S 152.1288°E
- Country: Australia
- State: Queensland
- LGA: Fraser Coast Region
- Location: 32.3 km (20.1 mi) SW of Brooweena; 50.9 km (31.6 mi) S of Biggenden; 81.1 km (50.4 mi) SW of Maryborough; 110 km (68 mi) SW of Hervey Bay; 326 km (203 mi) NNW of Brisbane

Government
  - State electorate: Maryborough
  - Federal division: Wide Bay

Area
  - Total: 200.8 km^{2} (77.5 sq mi)

Population
  - Total: 15 (2021 census)
  - Density: 0.0747/km^{2} (0.193/sq mi)
- Time zone: UTC+10:00 (AEST)
- Postcode: 4620
Suburbs around Malarga
Boompa	Teebar	Gigoomgan
Boompa	Malarga	Gigoomgan
Booubyjan	Tansey	Tansey

Malarga is a rural locality in the Fraser Coast Region, Queensland, Australia. In the 2021 census, Malarga had a population of 15 people.

== Geography ==
The Burnett Range forms part of the southern boundary of the locality, while the Coast Range forms part of the south-east boundary of the locality. Boogooramunya is a mountain in the south-east of the locality (25.8643°S 152.1365°E), rising to 734 metres (2,408 ft) above sea level.

The Brooweena Woolooga Road enters the locality from the north (Teebar) and exits to the north-east (Gigoomgan). The thoroughfare through the locality is Booubyjan Road which commences at the Brooweena Woolooga Road in the north-east of the locality and exits to the south-west (Booubyjan).

Three sections of the Grongah National Park are in the south-west, south, and south-east of the locality, extending into neighbouring Tansey and beyond. Apart from these protected areas, the land use is grazing on native vegetation.

== Demographics ==
In the 2016 census, Malarga had a population of 17 people.

In the 2021 census, Malarga had a population of 15 people.

== Education ==
There are no schools in Malarga. The nearest government primary schools are Brooweena State School in Brooweena to the north-east, Windera State School in Windera to the south-west, and Goomeri State School in Goomeri to the south. he nearest government secondary schools are Biggenden State School (to Year 10) in Biggenden to the north-west and Goomeri State School (to Year 10). There are no nearby schools offering education to Year 12; the alternatives are distance education and boarding school.
