= Marodian =

Mariodian may refer to:

- Marodian, Queensland, a locality in the Fraser Coast Region, Queensland, Australia
- Electoral district of Marodian, a former electorate in Queensland, Australia
