= Boompa =

Boompa may refer to:

- Boompa Records, a Canadian music business
- Boompa, Queensland, a locality in the Fraser Coast Region, Queensland, Australia
