= Boonara, Queensland =

Boonara
- Suburb
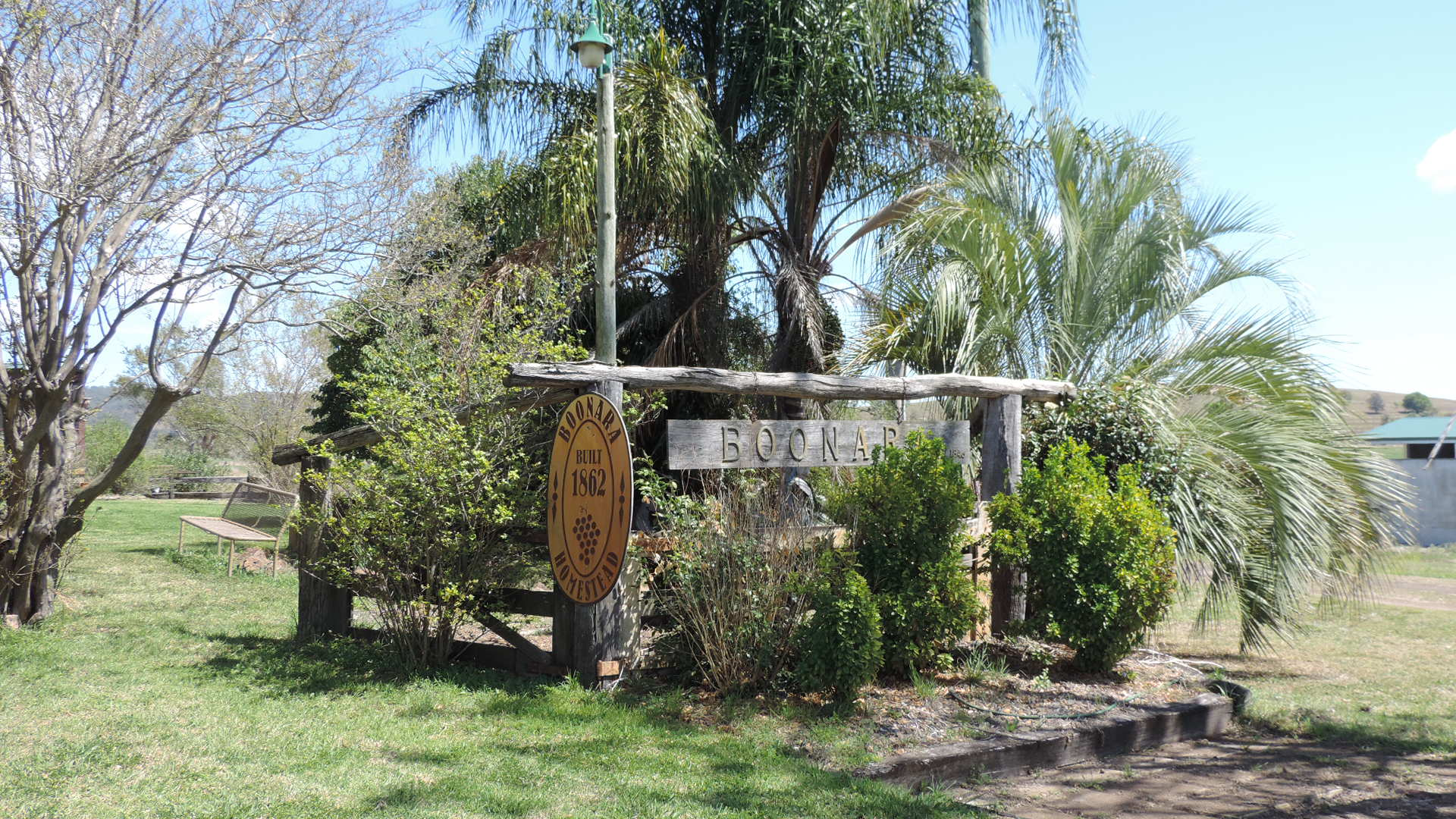
- Entrance to Boonara Homestead, 2015

- Interactive map of Boonara
- Coordinates: 26.0788°S 152.0261°E
- Country: Australia
- State: Queensland
- LGA: Gympie Region
- Location: 15.1 km (9.4 mi) N of Goomeri; 32.3 km (20.1 mi) NE of Murgon; 79.7 km (49.5 mi) W of Gympie; 246 km (153 mi) NNW of Brisbane
- Established: 1877

Government
  - State electorate: Nanango
  - Federal division: Wide Bay

Area
  - Total: 86.9 km^{2} (33.6 sq mi)

Population
  - Total: 60 (2021 census)
  - Density: 0.69/km^{2} (1.79/sq mi)
- Time zone: UTC+10:00 (AEST)
- Postcode: 4601
Suburbs around Boonara
| Cobbs Hill | Tansey | Tansey |
| Crownthorpe | Boonara | Cinnabar |
| Crownthorpe | Goomeribong | Goomeri |

Boonara is a rural locality in the Gympie Region, Queensland, Australia. In the 2021 census, Boonara had a population of 60 people.

== History ==
The Boonara pastoral station was established in 1846. Boonara Homestead was built in 1862 by the sons of David Jones.

Land in Boonara was open for selection on 17 April 1877; 47 square miles (120 km^{2}) were available.

Boonara Provisional School was opened on 20 January 1902. In 1909 became Boonara State School. It closed on 22 May 1964. It was on the Burnett Highway just to the south of the homestead (approx 26.0886°S 152.0559°E).

St David's Anglican Church opened in 1914.

Watchbox State School opened on 26 October 1936 under teacher Miss Ryan. The school was officially opened by the local Member of the Queensland Legislative Assembly, Harry Clayton. The school closed on 19 February 1967. The school was on a 3-acre (1.2 ha) site on the southern side of Watchbox Road (26.0662°S 152.0137°E).

== Demographics ==
In the 2016 census, Boonara had a population of 74 people.

In the 2021 census, Boonara had a population of 60 people.

== Heritage listings ==
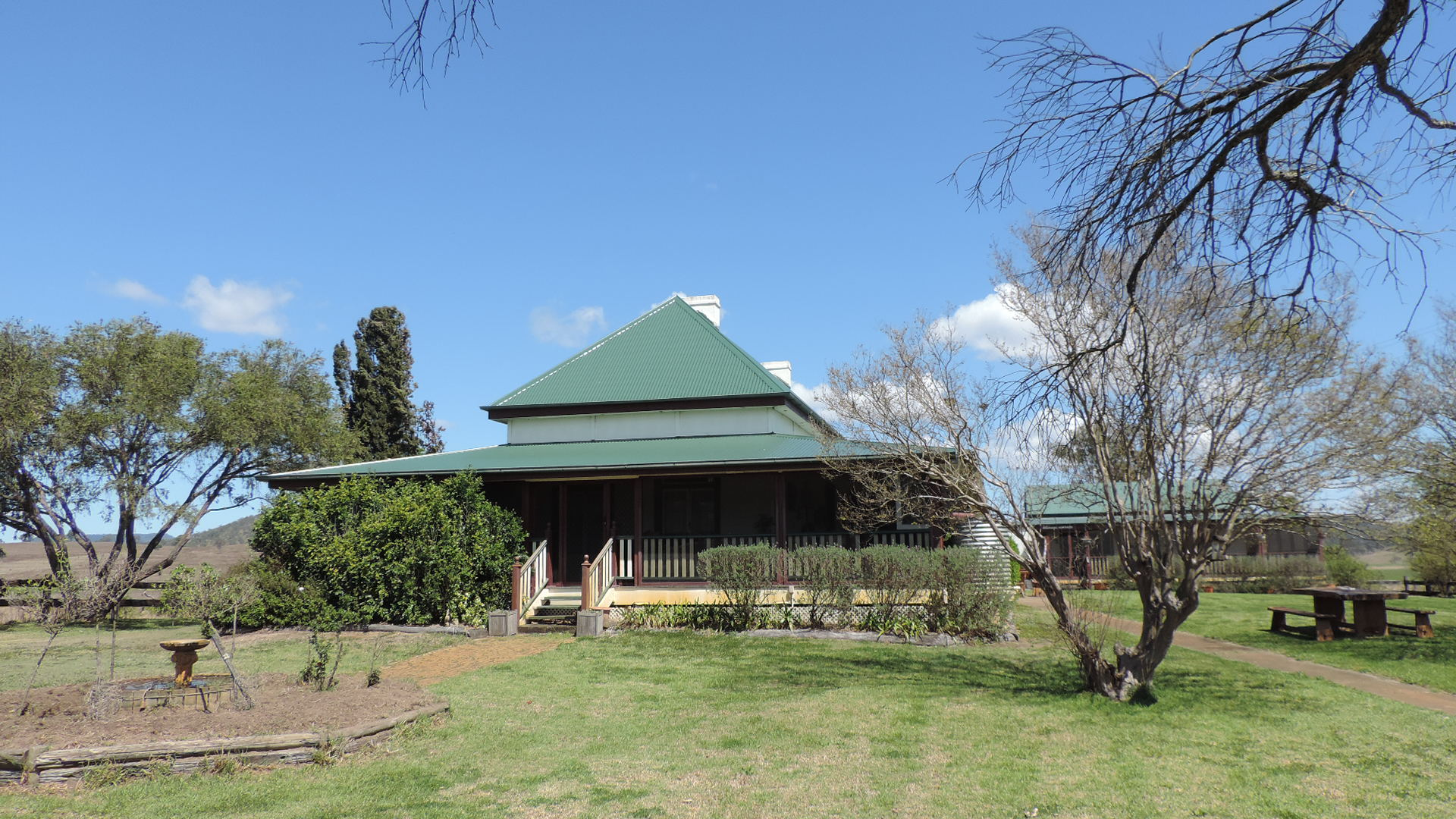
Boonara Homestead, 2015

The Boonara Homestead at 1791 Burnett Highway (26.0849°S 152.0517°E) is listed on the Gympie Heritage Register.

== Education ==
There are no schools in Boonara. The nearest government primary schools are Goomeri State School in neighbouring Goomeri to the south-east, Cloyna State School in Cloyna to the south-west, and Kilkivan State School in Kilkivan to the east. Both Goomeri State School and Kilkivan State School offering secondary schooling to Year 10. For secondary schooling to Year 12, the options are Murgon State High School in Murgon to the south and James Nash State High School in Gympie to the south-east.

== Amenities ==
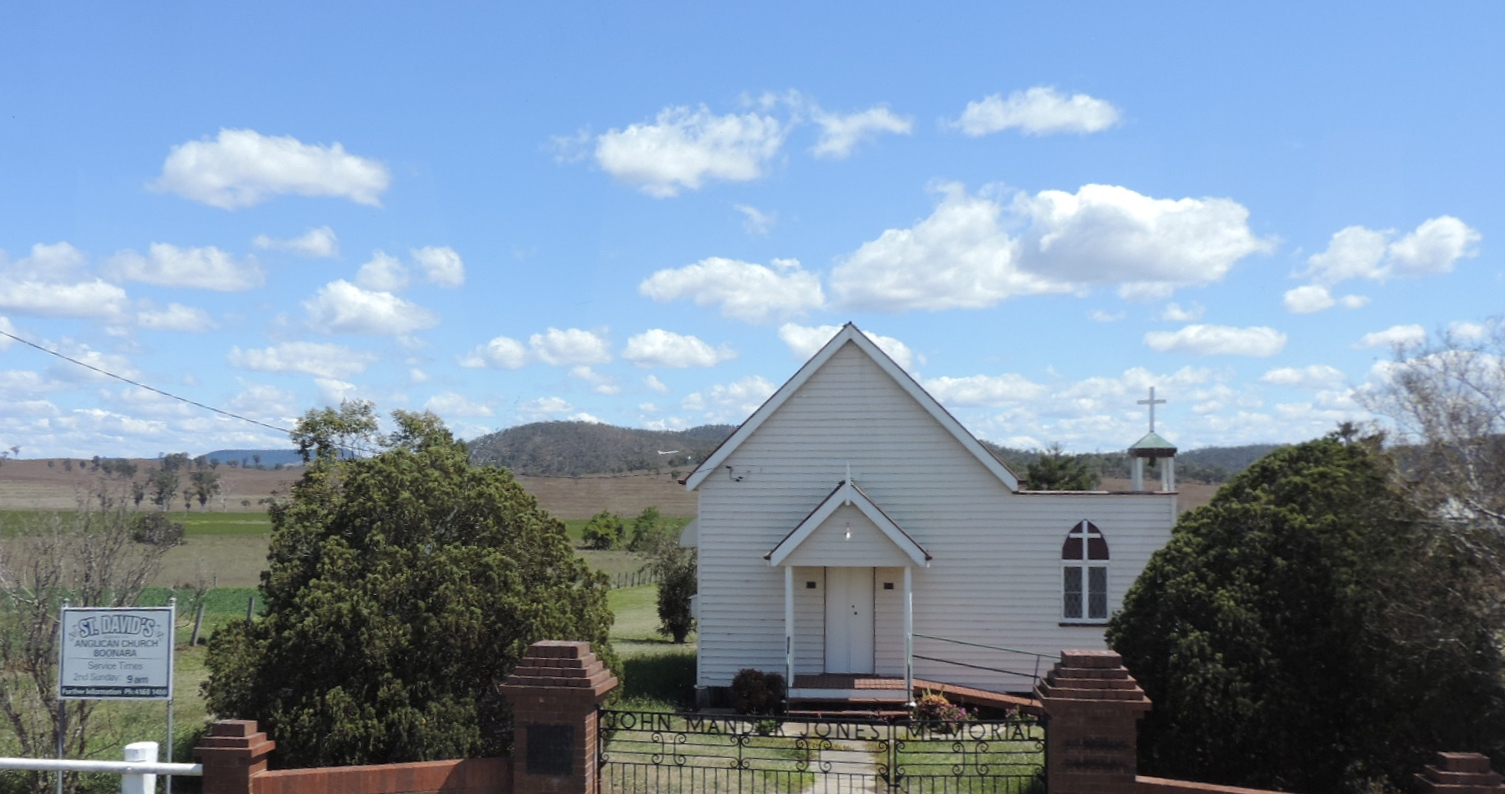
St David's Anglican Church, 2015

St David's Anglican Church is at 7179 Burnett Highway (26.0850°S 152.0537°E). There is a cemetery behind the church.

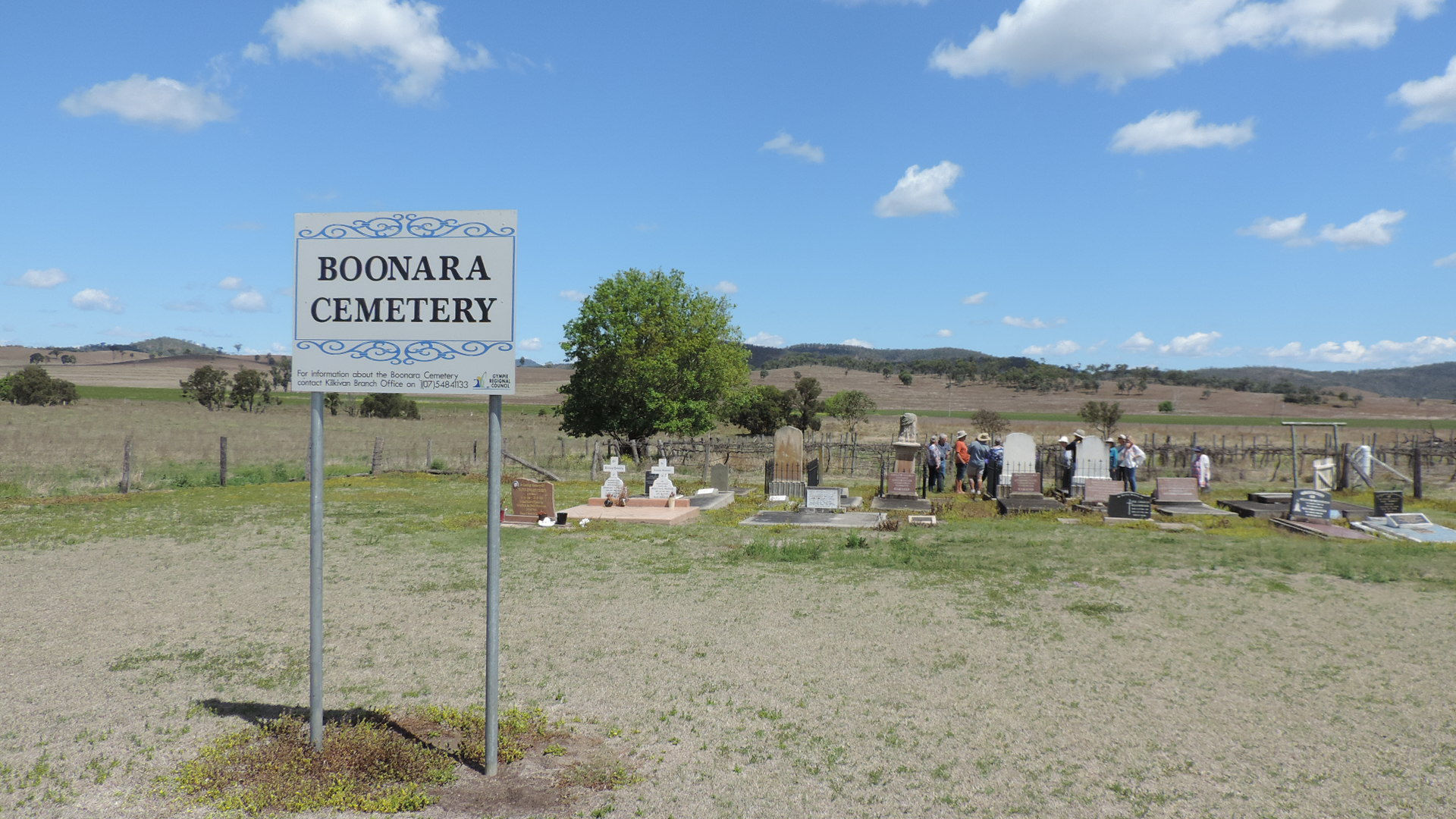
Boonara cemetery, 2015
