= Tansey, Queensland =

Tansey
- Town
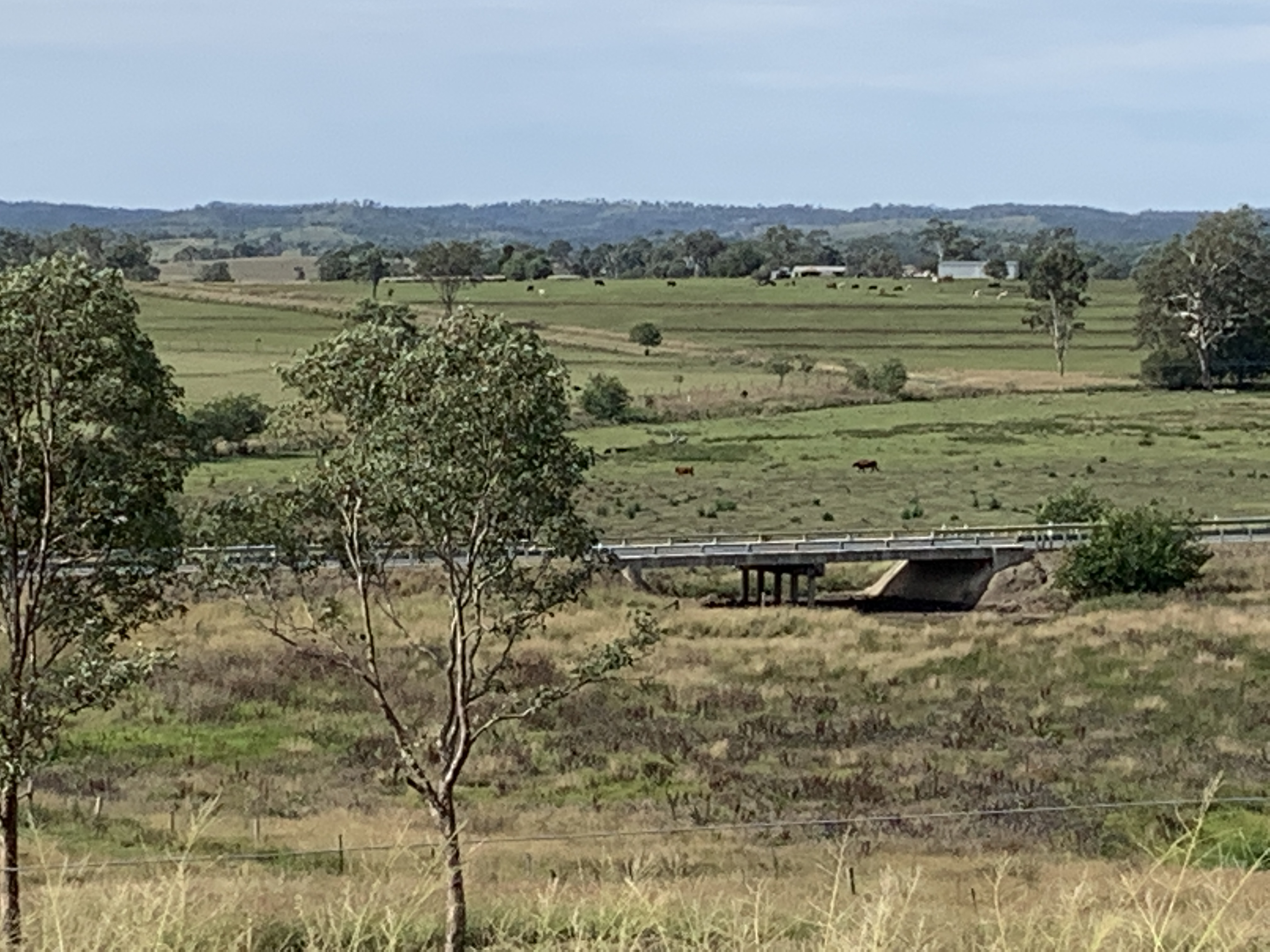
- Burnett Highway passing through Tansey, 2019

- Interactive map of Tansey
- Coordinates: 26.0241°S 152.0430°E
- Country: Australia
- State: Queensland
- LGA: Gympie Region
- Location: 17.0 km (10.6 mi) N of Goomeri; 23.7 km (14.7 mi) NW of Kilkivan; 34.0 km (21.1 mi) NE of Murgon; 73.7 km (45.8 mi) WNW of Gympie; 239 km (149 mi) NNW of Brisbane

Government
  - State electorate: Nanango
  - Federal division: Wide Bay

Area
  - Total: 352.2 km^{2} (136.0 sq mi)

Population
  - Total: 154 (2021 census)
  - Density: 0.4373/km^{2} (1.132/sq mi)
- Time zone: UTC+10:00 (AEST)
- Postcode: 4601
Localities around Tansey
Booubyjan	Malarga	Gigoomgan; Calgoa
Booubyjan	Tansey	Mudlo
Cobbs Hill	Boonara	Kilkivan; Cinnabar

Tansey is a rural town and locality in the Gympie Region, Queensland, Australia. In the 2021 census, the locality of Tansey had a population of 154 people.

== Geography ==
The north and centre of the locality is within Grongah National Park, which extends into neighbouring localities Malarga, Gigoomgan, Calgoa, and Mudlo. Apart from the national park, the predominant land use is cattle grazing.

The Burnett Highway passes through the south-west of the locality from Boonara in the south to Booubyjan in the west. The town is located on the highway at its intersection with the Kilkivan Tansey Road, which provides a connection to Kilkivan.

== History ==
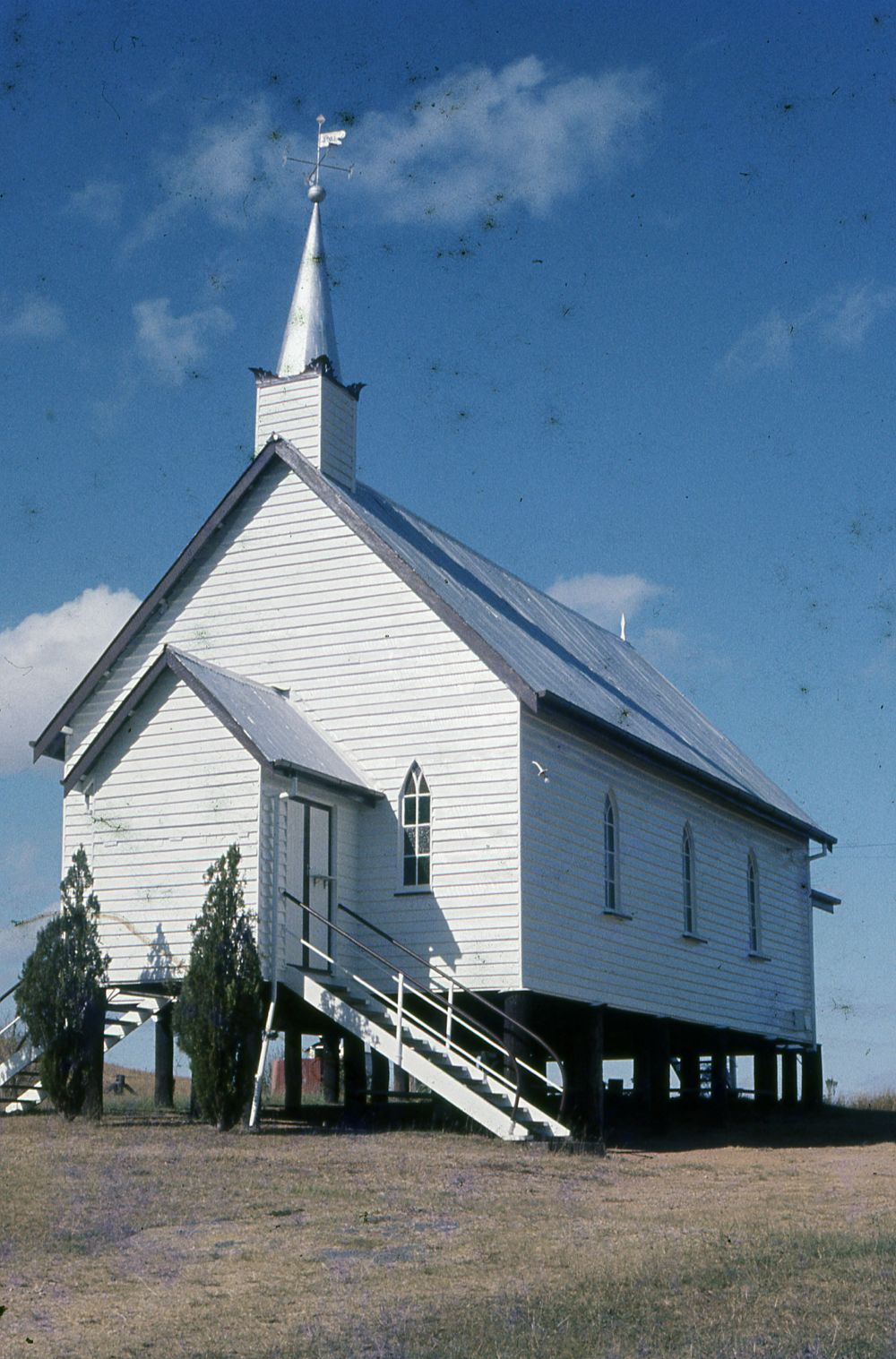
Apostolic Church, Tansey, 1975

The town takes its name from selector Michael Tansey, a resident on "Lakeview" from 1877.

On 26 September 1926, an Apostolic church was opened by Reverend W. Neimeyer. It was at 103 Wittenberg Road (26.0399°S 152.0384°E). Circa 1997, the church was relocated to 19 Olive Street, Goomeri.

Tansey State School opened on 6 June 1916. It closed on 13 December 1996. It was on Planted Creek Road (approx 26.0232°S 152.0439°E).

Previously, an abbotoir (Anstey) operated from c.1970, as did a local cheese factory in the same building (est. 1942, closed c.1967).

Tansey Bowls Club was formed in 1953. Located adjacent to Boonara Creek, the bowls club was flooded in 1955-1956, in 2013, and in 2022.

Tansey suffered considerable damage when a tornado struck the community in October 2018. The Bureau of Meteorology said the tornado hit the town just after 3pm on 11 October 2018.

== Demographics ==
In the 2016 census, the locality of Tansey had a population of 144 people.

In the 2021 census, the locality of Tansey had a population of 154 people.

== Education ==
There are no schools in Tansey. The nearest government primary schools are Kilkivan State School in neighbouring Kilkivan to the south-east and Goomeri State School in Goomeri to the south. Both of these schools also provide secondary education to Year 10. For secondary education to Year 12, the nearest government schools are Murgon State High School in Murgon to the south and James Nash State High School in Gympie to the south-east.

== Amenities ==
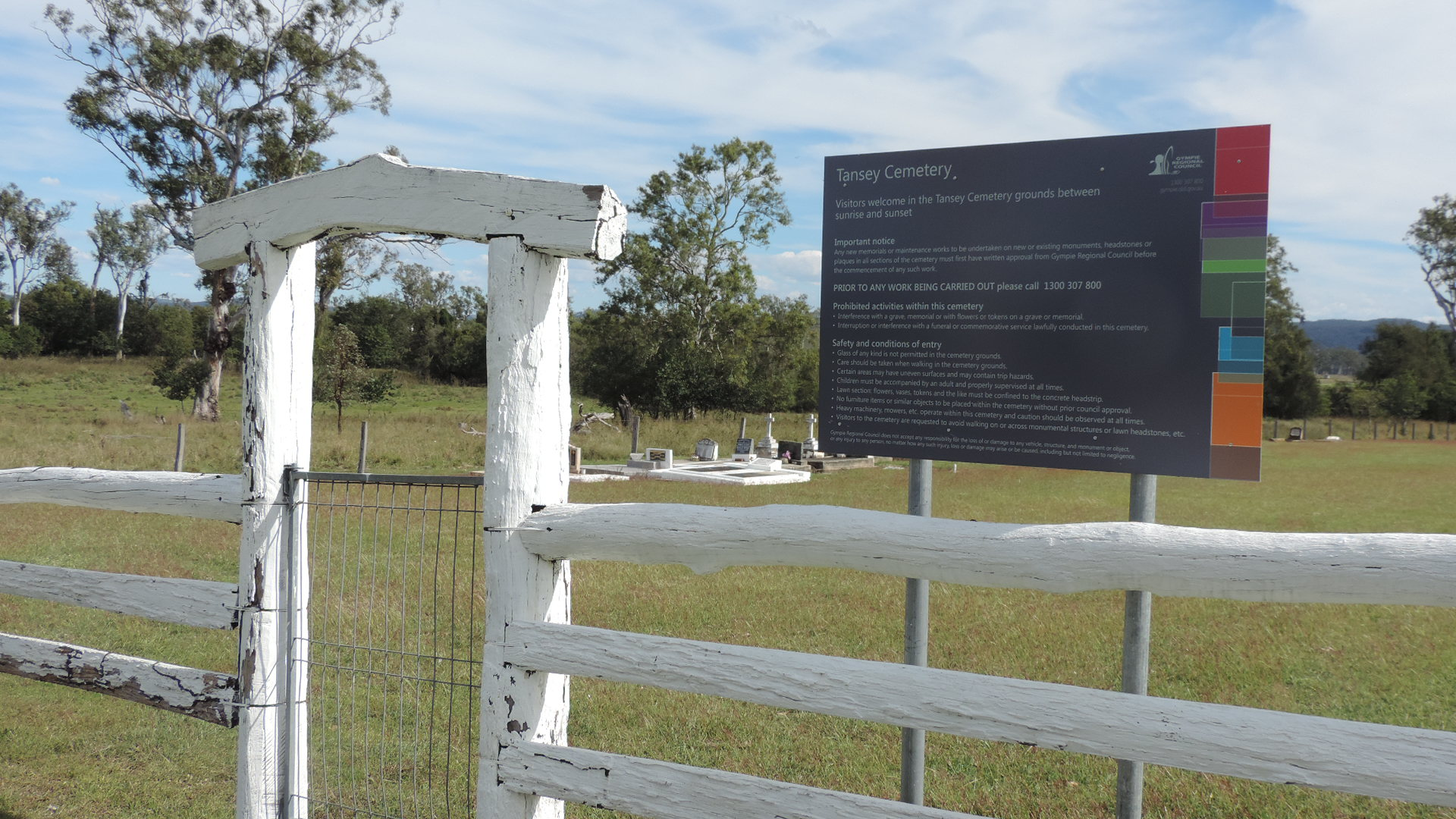
Tansey Cemetery, 2019

Tansey Showgrounds is at 30 Tansey Hall Road (26.0335°S 152.0447°E). Tansey Hall is at the showgrounds (26.0344°S 152.0450°E).

Tansey Bowls Club is at 28 Tansey Hall Road (26.0348°S 152.0456°E).

Tansey Cemetery is at the end of Tansey Cemetery Road (off the Burnett Highway, 26.0288°S 152.0407°E).
