= Goomeribong, Queensland =

Goomeribong
- Suburb
- Interactive map of Goomeribong
- Coordinates: 26.1427°S 152.0177°E
- Country: Australia
- State: Queensland
- LGA: Gympie Region
- Location: 8.3 km (5.2 mi) NNW of Goomeri; 25.3 km (15.7 mi) NE of Murgon; 83.3 km (51.8 mi) W of Gympie; 262 km (163 mi) NNW of Brisbane

Government
  - State electorate: Nanango
  - Federal division: Wide Bay

Area
  - Total: 62.2 km^{2} (24.0 sq mi)

Population
  - Total: 49 (2021 census)
  - Density: 0.788/km^{2} (2.040/sq mi)
- Time zone: UTC+10:00 (AEST)
- Postcode: 4601
Suburbs around Goomeribong
Crownthorpe	Boonara	Boonara
Tablelands	Goomeribong	Goomeri
Manyung	Manyung	Goomeri

Goomeribong (pronounced goo-MARY-bong) is a rural locality in the Gympie Region, Queensland, Australia. In the 2021 census, Goomeribong had a population of 49 people.

== Geography ==
Goomeribong is north-west of the town of Goomeri. The locality is bounded to the south-east by Goomeri West Road and to south-west by Harm Road.

The Burnett Highway forms a very short segment of the locality's eastern boundary but does not generally provide access to the locality.

Nangur National Park is in the north-west of the locality. The national park protects the endangered population of the Nangur spiny skink (Nangura spinosa) and its habitat.

Boat Mountain Conservation Park extends into the south-west of the locality. The ridge has a distinctive shape, looking like an upturned boat. It is known for its many plant and bird species.

Apart from the protected areass, the land use is predominantly grazing on native vegetation with some crop growing.

== History ==
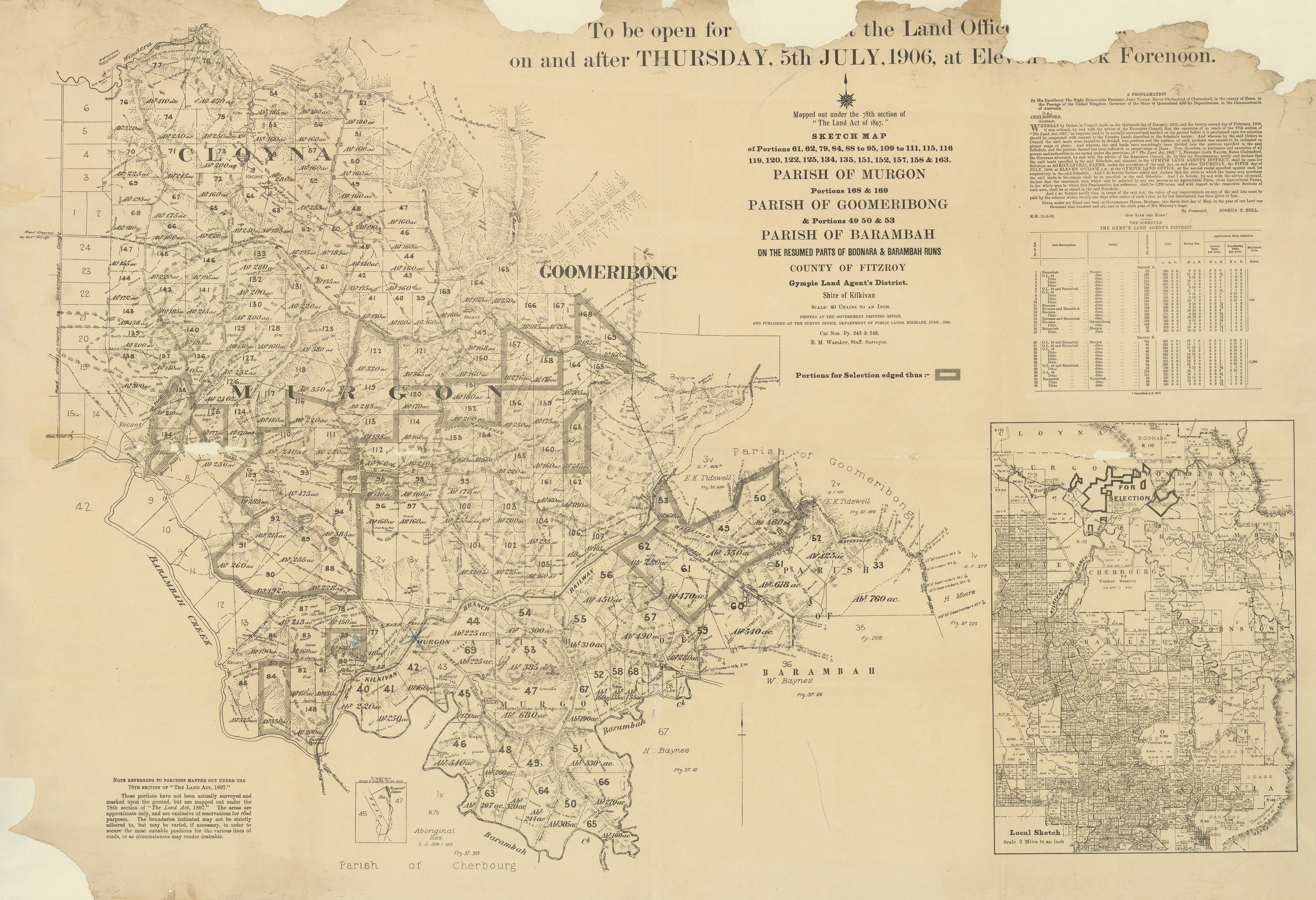
Land sales map, 1906

Land in Goomeribong was open for selection on 17 April 1877; 41 square miles (110 km^{2}) were available.

In July 1906, 32 allotments were advertised for selection by the Department of Public Lands Office. The map advertising the land selection states the allotments are portions in the Parishes of Murgon, Goomeribong and Barambah. The portions were left over from 5 April 1906.

Goomeribong State School opened on 12 February 1920, becoming Goomeribong Provisional School in April 1924. It closed in May 1925 and reopened in 1929. It closed permanently in 1967.

== Demographics ==
In the 2016 census, Goomeribong had a population of 41 people.

In the 2021 census, Goomeribong had a population of 49 people.

== Education ==
There are no schools in Goomeribong. The nearest government primary schools are Goomeri State School in neighbouring Goomeri to the south-east and Murgon State School in Murgon to the south-west. The nearest government secondary schools are Goomeri State School (to Year 10) and Murgon State High School (to Year 12) in Murgon.
