= Cobbs Hill, Queensland =

Cobbs Hill
- Suburb
- Interactive map of Cobbs Hill
- Coordinates: 26.0569°S 151.9108°E
- Country: Australia
- State: Queensland
- LGA: South Burnett Region
- Location: 22.8 km (14.2 mi) N of Murgon; 65.0 km (40.4 mi) NNE of Kingaroy; 90.8 km (56.4 mi) W of Gympie; 257 km (160 mi) NNW of Brisbane

Government
  - State electorate: Nanango
  - Federal division: Wide Bay

Area
  - Total: 47.9 km^{2} (18.5 sq mi)

Population
  - Total: 0 (2021 census)
  - Density: 0.000/km^{2} (0.000/sq mi)
- Time zone: UTC+10:00 (AEST)
- Postcode: 4605
Suburbs around Cobbs Hill
Booubyjan	Booubyjan	Tansey
Kitoba	Cobbs Hill	Boonara
Kitoba	Sunny Nook	Crownthorpe

Cobbs Hill is a rural locality in the South Burnett Region, Queensland, Australia. In the 2021 census, Cobbs Hill had "no people or a very low population".

== Geography ==
The mountain Cobbs Hill is in the south-west of the locality (26.0879°S 151.8928°E), rising 527 metres (1,729 ft) above sea level.

The land use is predominantly grazing on native vegetation with some plantation forestry in the south-west of the locality.

== Demographics ==
In the 2016 census, Cobbs Hill had a population of 22 people.

In the 2021 census, Cobbs Hill had "no people or a very low population".

== Education ==
There are no schools in Cobbs Hill. The nearest government primary schools are Windera State School in Windera to the west and Cloyna State School in Cloyna to the south-west. The nearest government secondary school is Murgon State High School in Murgon to the south. There is also a Catholic primary school in Murgon.
