= Crownthorpe, Queensland =

Crownthorpe
- Suburb
- Interactive map of Crownthorpe
- Coordinates: 26.1144°S 151.9377°E
- Country: Australia
- State: Queensland
- LGAs: South Burnett Region; Gympie Region
- Location: 21.6 km (13.4 mi) N of Murgon; 63.8 km (39.6 mi) NNE of Kingaroy; 86.1 km (53.5 mi) W of Gympie; 252 km (157 mi) NNW of Brisbane

Government
  - State electorate: Nanango
  - Federal division: Wide Bay

Area
  - Total: 45.0 km^{2} (17.4 sq mi)
- Elevation: 446 m (1,463 ft)

Population
  - Total: 45 (2021 census)
  - Density: 1.000/km^{2} (2.59/sq mi)
- Time zone: UTC+10:00 (AEST)
- Postcode: 4605
Suburbs around Crownthorpe
Cobbs Hill	Boonara	Boonara
Sunny Nook	Crownthorpe	Goomeribong
Sunny Nook	Tablelands	Tablelands

Crownthorpe is a rural locality split between the South Burnett Region and the Gympie Region, in Queensland, Australia. In the 2021 census, Crownthorpe had a population of 45 people.

== Geography ==
Crownthorpe Road is the main route through the locality, entering from the south (Tablelands) and exiting to the north-east (Boonara).

Double Knob is a mountain on the northern border of the locality adjoining Cobbs Hill (26.0840°S 151.9189°E) rising to 516 metres (1,693 ft) above sea level.

The land use is predominantly grazing on native vegetation.

== History ==
In February 1914, tenders for called for an open-air school (a simple structure with canvas walls). Crownthorpe Provisional School was officially opened on 1 September 1914 by Thomas Armstrong, the Chairman of the Murgon Shire Council. The opening of the school had been delayed until a teacher could be obtained. The first teacher was Miss Janie Bell. On 1 December 1914, it became Crownthorpe State School. It closed in 1952. It was on the south-western corner of Crownthorpe Road and Goomeri West Road (approx 26.12682°S 151.94178°E).

== Demographics ==
In the 2016 census, Crownthorpe had a population of 41 people.

In the 2021 census, Crownthorpe had a population of 45 people.

== Education ==
There are no schools in Crownthorpe. The nearest government primary school is Cloyna State School in Cloyna to the west. The nearest government secondary school is Murgon State High School in Murgon to the south.
