= Sunny Nook =

- Suburb
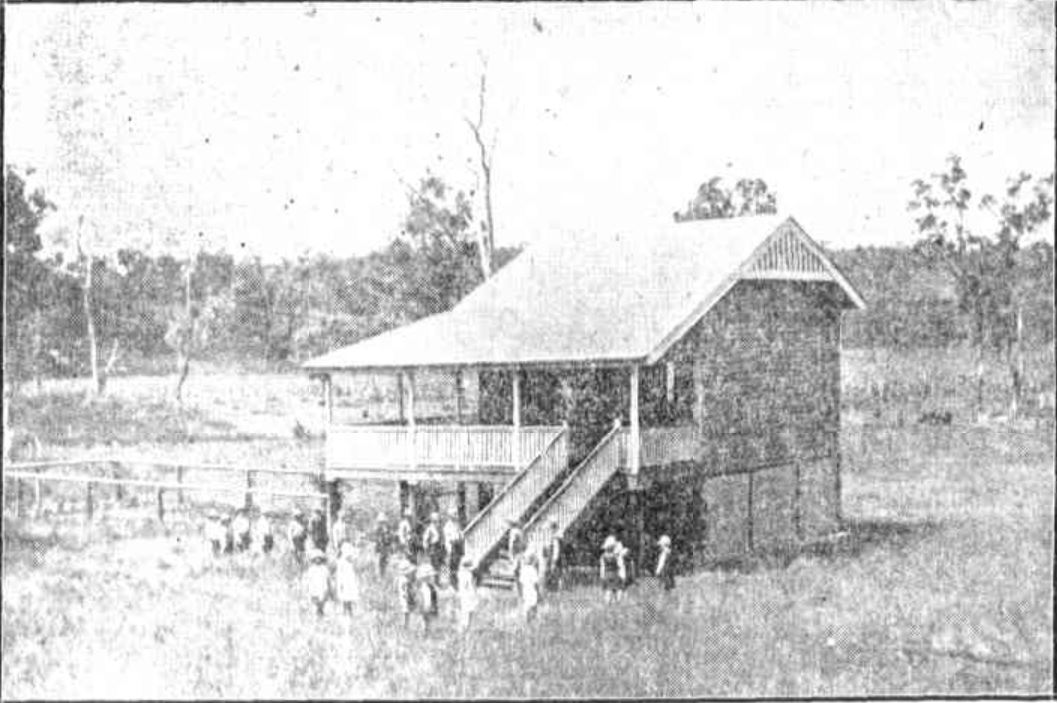
- Sunny Nook State School, 1930

- Interactive map of Sunny Nook
- Coordinates: 26.1122°S 151.8908°E
- Country: Australia
- State: Queensland
- LGA: South Burnett Region
- Location: 18.0 km (11.2 mi) NNW of Murgon; 57.2 km (35.5 mi) N of Kingaroy; 110 km (68 mi) W of Gympie; 285 km (177 mi) NW of Brisbane

Government
  - State electorate: Nanango
  - Federal division: Wide Bay

Area
  - Total: 18.8 km^{2} (7.3 sq mi)

Population
  - Total: 27 (2021 census)
  - Density: 1.436/km^{2} (3.72/sq mi)
- Time zone: UTC+10:00 (AEST)
- Postcode: 4605
Suburbs around Sunny Nook
Kitoba	Cobbs Hill	Crownthorpe
Cloyna	Sunny Nook	Crownthorpe
Merlwood	Merlwood	Tablelands

Sunny Nook is a rural locality in the South Burnett Region, Queensland, Australia. In the 2021 census, Sunny Nook had a population of 27 people.

== Geography ==
The land use is predominantly grazing on native vegetation with some crop growing.

== History ==
Sunny Nook State School opened on 1 September 1927. It closed in 1945. It was on a 3-acre (1.2 ha) site on the northern side of Headings Road (26.11467°S 151.88375°E). In 1951, tenders were called to relocate the school building to Cloyna State School.

== Demographics ==
In the 2016 census, Sunny Nook had a population of 23 people.

In the 2021 census, Sunny Nook had a population of 27 people.

== Education ==
There are no schools in Sunny Nook. The nearest government primary school is Cloyna State School in neighbouring Cloyna to the west. The nearest government secondary school is Murgon State High School in Murgon to the south-east.
