= Mudlo, Queensland =

Mudlo
- Suburb
- Interactive map of Mudlo
- Coordinates: 25.9816°S 152.2247°E
- Country: Australia
- State: Queensland
- LGA: Gympie Region
- Location: 16 km (9.9 mi) N of Kilkivan; 57 km (35 mi) NE of Murgon; 64 km (40 mi) NW of Gympie; 234 km (145 mi) NNW of Brisbane

Government
  - State electorate: Nanango
  - Federal division: Wide Bay

Area
  - Total: 163.3 km^{2} (63.1 sq mi)

Population
  - Total: 0 (2021 census)
  - Density: 0.0000/km^{2} (0.000/sq mi)
- Postcode: 4600
Suburbs around Mudlo
Tansey	Calgoa	Woolooga
Tansey	Mudlo	Woolooga
Tansey	Kilkivan	Kilkivan

Mudlo is a rural locality in the Gympie Region, Queensland, Australia. In the 2021 census, Mudlo had "no people or a very low population".

== Geography ==
Mudlo is largely undeveloped land with a mountainous terrain being part of the Coast Range with Mount Mudlo at 467 metres (1,532 ft). Most of the northern part of the locality is within the Grongah National Park and some of the southern locality being in the Mudlo National Park and the Calgoa State Forest. The developed land is used for grazing on native vegetation.

Mudlo Road passes through the locality from Kilkivan to the south and Tansey in the west.

== Demographics ==
In the 2016 census, Mudlo had a population of 7 people.

In the 2021 census, Mudlo had "no people or a very low population".

== Education ==
There are no schools in Mudlo. The nearest government primary schools is Kilkivan State School in neighbouring Kilkivan to the south and Woolooga State School in neighbouring Woolooga to the south-east. The nearest government secondary school is James Nash State High School in Gympie to the south-east.
