= Marodian, Queensland =

Marodian
- Suburb
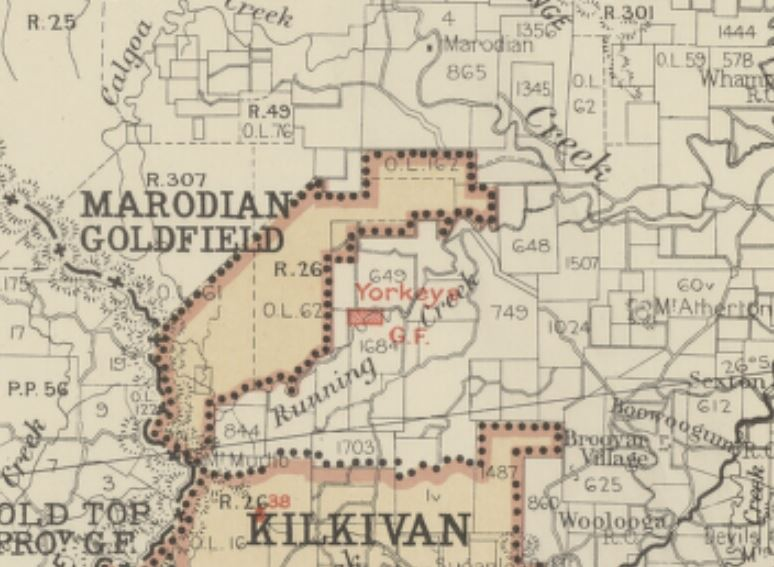
- Map of Marodian Goldfield, 1914

- Interactive map of Marodian
- Coordinates: 25.8455°S 152.2927°E
- Country: Australia
- State: Queensland
- LGA: Fraser Coast Region
- Location: 43.9 km (27.3 mi) NNE of Kilkivan; 59.9 km (37.2 mi) NW of Gympie; 76.3 km (47.4 mi) SW of Maryborough; 117 km (73 mi) SW of Hervey Bay; 235 km (146 mi) NNW of Brisbane

Government
  - State electorate: Maryborough
  - Federal division: Wide Bay

Area
  - Total: 69.5 km^{2} (26.8 sq mi)

Population
  - Total: 0 (2021 census)
  - Density: 0.000/km^{2} (0.000/sq mi)
- Time zone: UTC+10:00 (AEST)
- Postcode: 4570
Suburbs around Marodian
Gigoomgan	Gigoomgan	Glenbar
Calgoa	Marodian	Mount Urah
Calgoa	Woolooga	Glen Echo

Marodian is a rural locality in the Fraser Coast Region, Queensland, Australia. In the 2021 census, Marodian had "no people or a very low population".

== Geography ==
The Brooweena - Woolooga Road enters the locality from the north (Gigoomgan) and exits to the south (Woolooga).

Almost all of the locality is occupied by the Marodian pastoral station, where the land use is grazing on native vegetation.

== History ==
The locality takes its name from the parish name, which in turn is derived from the name of a pastoral run held by James and Norman Leith Hay in 1852. The pastoral run name might come from the Kabi language word maridhan meaning place of kangaroos.

In 1867, the Marodian area was suspected of having gold due to geological similarities with other gold-bearing areas. There were early finds of alluvial gold at Colo Flats and Yorkey’s Hill. In 1884, the Queensland Surveyor General, A. C. Gregory, continued to promote the likelihood of gold in the Marodian area. In 1901, the Marodian Gold Mining Syndicate dug a shaft down to 350 feet (110 m). In 1902, interest in the goldfield was still low with 109 people on the goldfield compared with over 14,000 on the Gympie goldfields. In 1903, the Marodian Gold Mining Company established a mining lease of 40 acres (16 ha), but operations had ceased by 1904.

== Demographics ==
In the 2016 census, Marodian had "no people or a very low population".

In the 2021 census, Marodian had "no people or a very low population".

== Education ==
There are no schools in Marodian. The nearest government primary schools are:

- Brooweena State School in Brooweena to the north
- Theebine State School in Theebine to the south-east
- Woolooga State School in neighbouring Woolooga to the south

The nearest government secondary schools are:

- Kilkivan State School (to Year 10) in Kilkivan to the south
- James Nash State High School (to Year 12) in Gympie to the south-east
