= Woolooga =

- Town
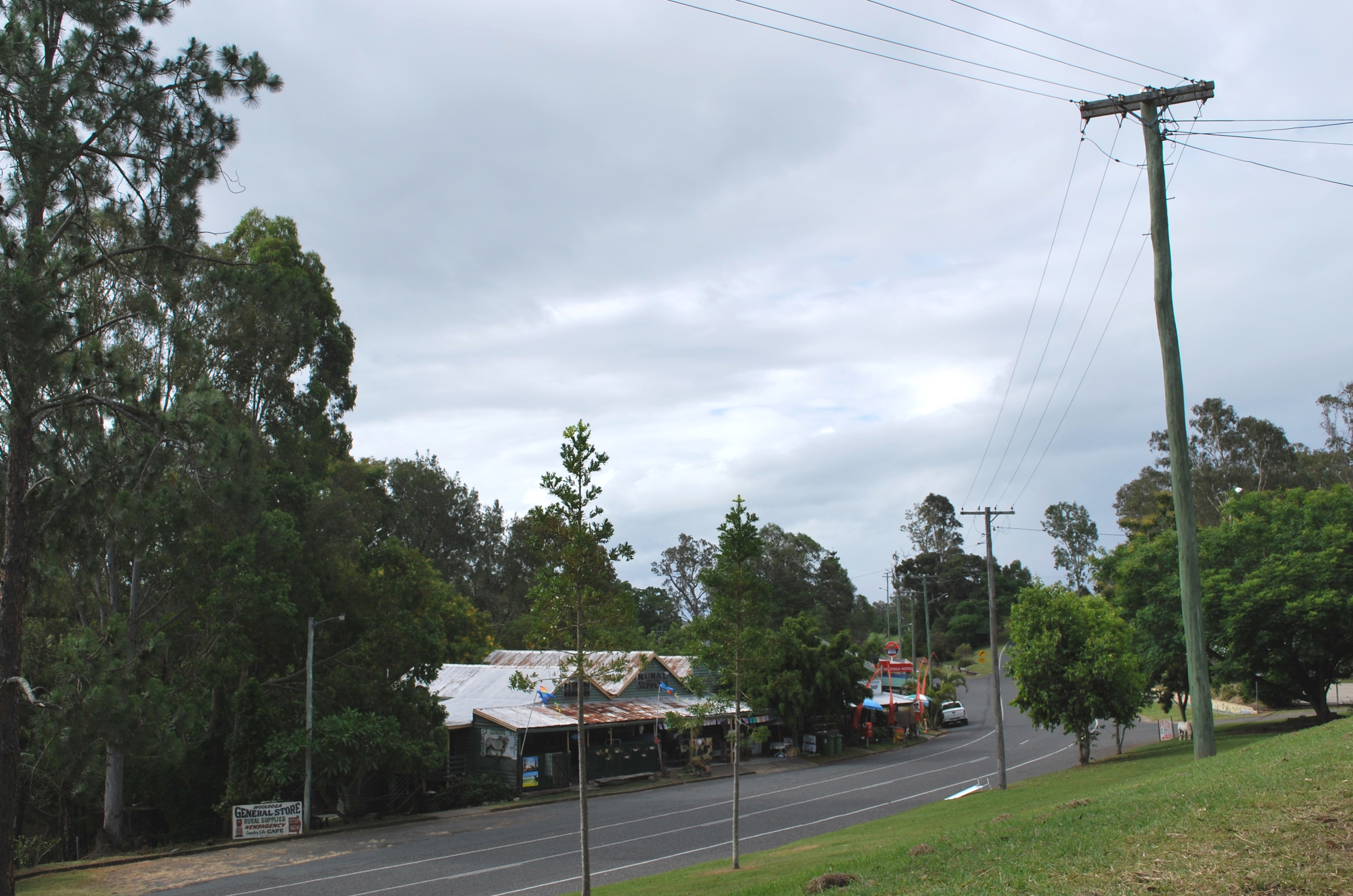
- The main street of Woolooga, showing the general store, with the pub and community hall around the bend.

- Interactive map of Woolooga
- Coordinates: 26.0516°S 152.3925°E
- Country: Australia
- State: Queensland
- LGA: Gympie Region
- Location: 29.2 km (18.1 mi) NE of Kilkivan; 46 km (29 mi) NW of Gympie; 211 km (131 mi) NNW of Brisbane
- Established: 1910

Government
  - State electorates: Nanango; Gympie
  - Federal division: Wide Bay

Area
  - Total: 250.1 km^{2} (96.6 sq mi)

Population
  - Total: 310 (2021 census)
  - Density: 1.240/km^{2} (3.21/sq mi)
- Time zone: UTC+10:00 (AEST)
- Postcode: 4570
Localities around Woolooga
Calgoa	Marodian	Glen Echo
Mudlo	Woolooga	Miva
Kilkivan	Oakview; Lower Wonga	Sexton

Woolooga is a rural town and locality in the Gympie Region, Queensland, Australia. In the 2021 census, the locality of Woolooga had a population of 310 people.

The town is located in the Gympie Region local government area, 221 kilometres (137 mi) north of the state capital, Brisbane.

== Geography ==
The town is located in the south of the locality. The railway line from Theebine to Nanango passes from the east to the south-west through the locality, but the line is no longer operating. The town was served by the Woolooga railway station (26°03′01″S 152°23′33″E) while the eastern part was served by the Boowoogum railway station (26°01′30″S 152°25′16″E), both of which are now abandoned.

The Wide Bay Creek meanders from the south-west of the locality to the east.

== History ==
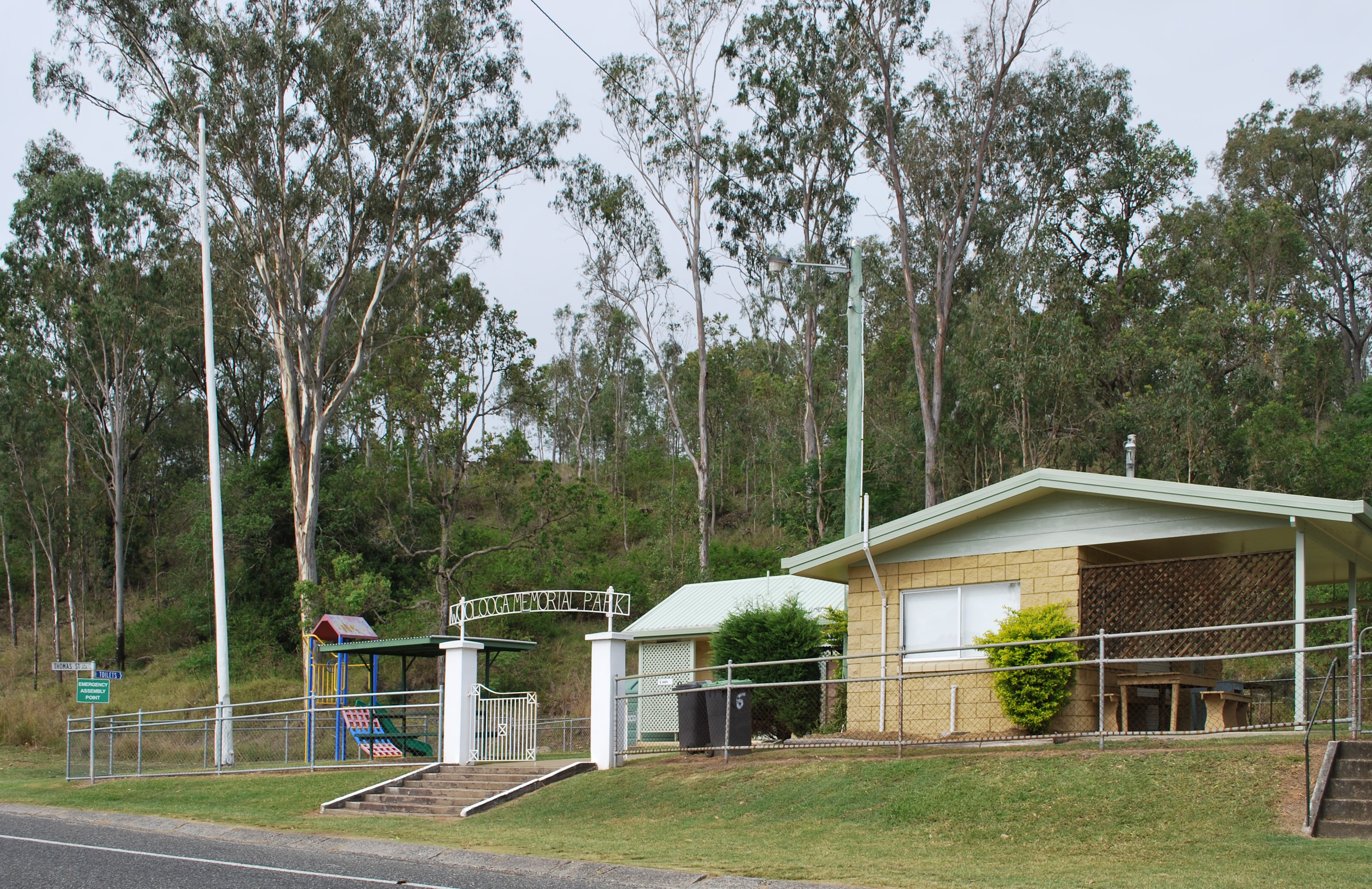
Woolooga Memorial Park, 2010

Around 1848, John Murray decided to become a pastoral squatter and chose to go to the frontier region of Wide Bay–Burnett in the north of the colony of New South Wales to obtain land. Murray occupied the Walooga run about 40 kilometers west of Gympie. To the south was Widgee Widgee taken up by the Tooth brothers, to the south-west Kilkivan occupied by J D MacTaggart, and to the north-west was Henry Cox Corfield's Gigoomgan run. Even though it appears that Murray lived on Walooga up to 1852, he had never met the conditions to hold the rights to the property and in late 1850 it was declared a vacant run. Murray went on to serve with the Australian native police, a paramilitary force, for nearly twenty years.

In 1850 tenders were called for the lease of Crown Lands known as Walooga. The boundaries of the pastoral run were described as:- "To start from Walooga Hut on Kilkivan Creek, west to Mount Warren 2 miles (3.2 km); from thence by a line south 2 miles (3.2 km) to a tree marked J; from thence by a line east 12½ miles to a tree marked M; from thence north by a line to the creek 2 miles (3.2 km); and from thence to the starting point (Walooga Hut) 10½ miles, it being understood that Kilkivan Creek forms the northern boundary." William Powell became the licensee for the pastoral run of Walooga in May 1854. In 1858 the license for Walooga was transferred to Robert Tooth, who had the license for several adjoining runs severally known as Widgee Widgee. Land use at this time was large-scale wool growing. By 1868 Walooga was described as a vacated sheep station, and in 1869 these runs were transferred to the Bank of New South Wales. In August that year 120,300 acres of the runs that comprised Widgee station were resumed for the purpose of selection.

Woolooga was a site of frontier war in the 1850s and 1860s.

Robert Stuart Lord and his brother Alfred Percy Lord won land in selection ballots in 1875 and 1876.

Woolooga railway station was named in 1886 by the Queensland Railways Department and subsequently became used as the town and locality name. It is reported to be an Aboriginal word from the Kabi language with wului meaning smoke and tha meaning ground/place.

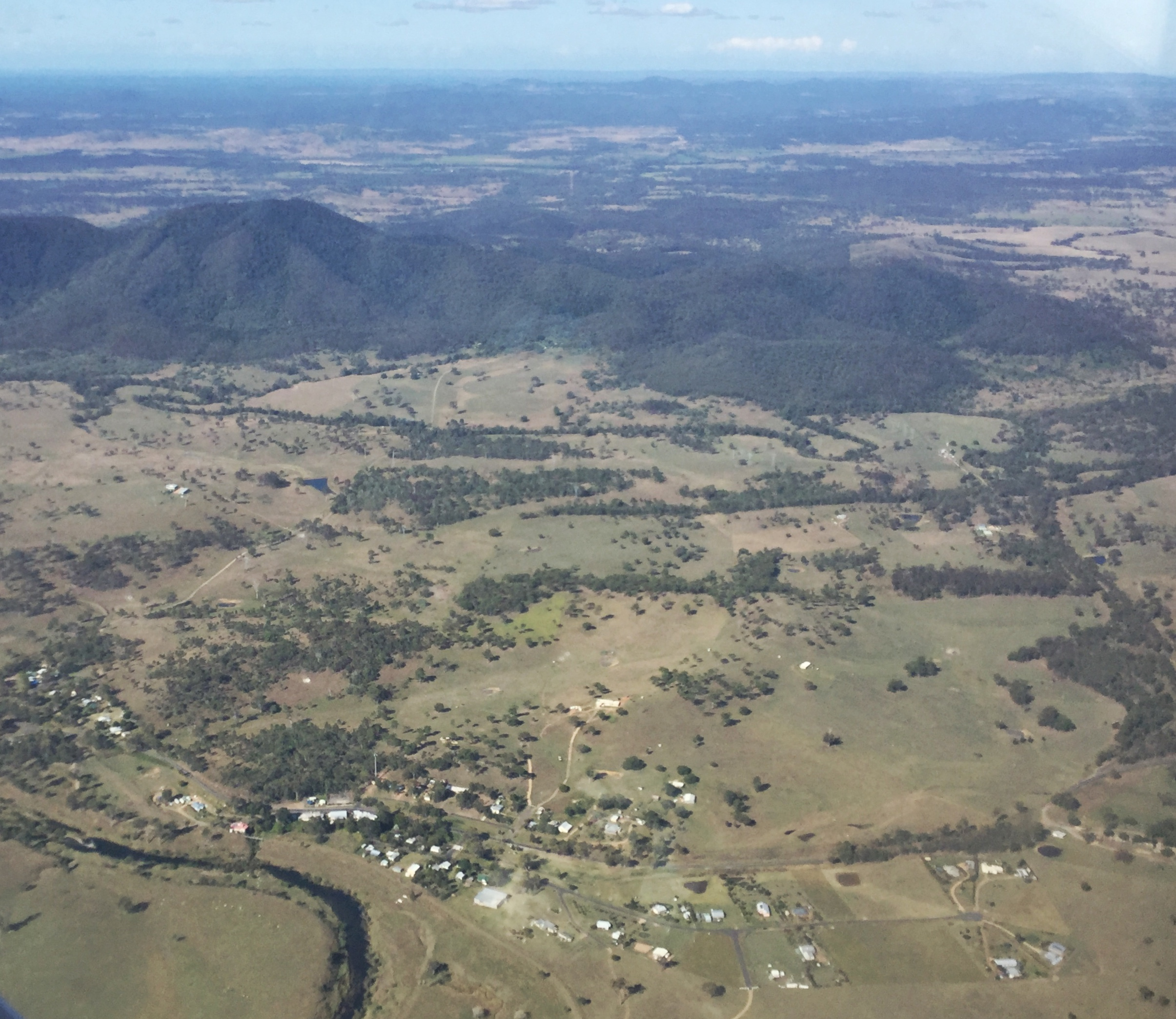
Aerial view of Woolooga looking east, 2016

Woolooga State School opened on 20 January 1913.

Wonga Upper Provisional School opened on 13 July 1914. On 1 December 1914 it became Wonga Upper State School. It closed in 1959.

The Woolooga Memorial Park commemorates those who served in war. It is located in Thomas Street.

Woolooga was affected by the 2010–2011 Queensland floods. A 2-metre (6.6 ft) wall of water rushed through the town, inundating the public hall and the pub. The general store was also severely damaged by the flood.

== Demographics ==
In the 2006 census, the locality of Woolooga and the surrounding rural area had a population of 319 people.

In the 2011 census, the locality of Woolooga had a population of 274 people.

In the 2016 census, the locality of Woolooga had a population of 247 people.

In the 2021 census, the locality of Woolooga had a population of 310 people.

== Heritage listings ==
Woolooga has a number of heritage-listed sites, including:

- Theebine–Kilkivan railway line: Woolooga Rail Bridge (26.0577°S 152.3796°E)

== Education ==
Woolooga State School is a government primary (Prep–6) school for boys and girls at Edwards Road (26.0483°S 152.3958°E). In 2018, the school had an enrolment of 14 students with 2 teachers and 5 non-teaching staff (2 full-time equivalent).

There is no secondary school. The nearest government secondary schools are Kilkivan State School (to Year 10) in neighbouring Kilkivan to the south-west and James Nash State High School in Gympie to the south-east.

== Amenities ==
Woolooga Memorial Park is in Thomas Street (also known as the Bauple Woolooga Road) at the corner of Booker Street (26.0531°S 152.3927°E). It commemorates those who have served Australia during times of war with their names listed on a brass Honour Roll.
