= Teebar, Queensland =

Teebar
- Suburb
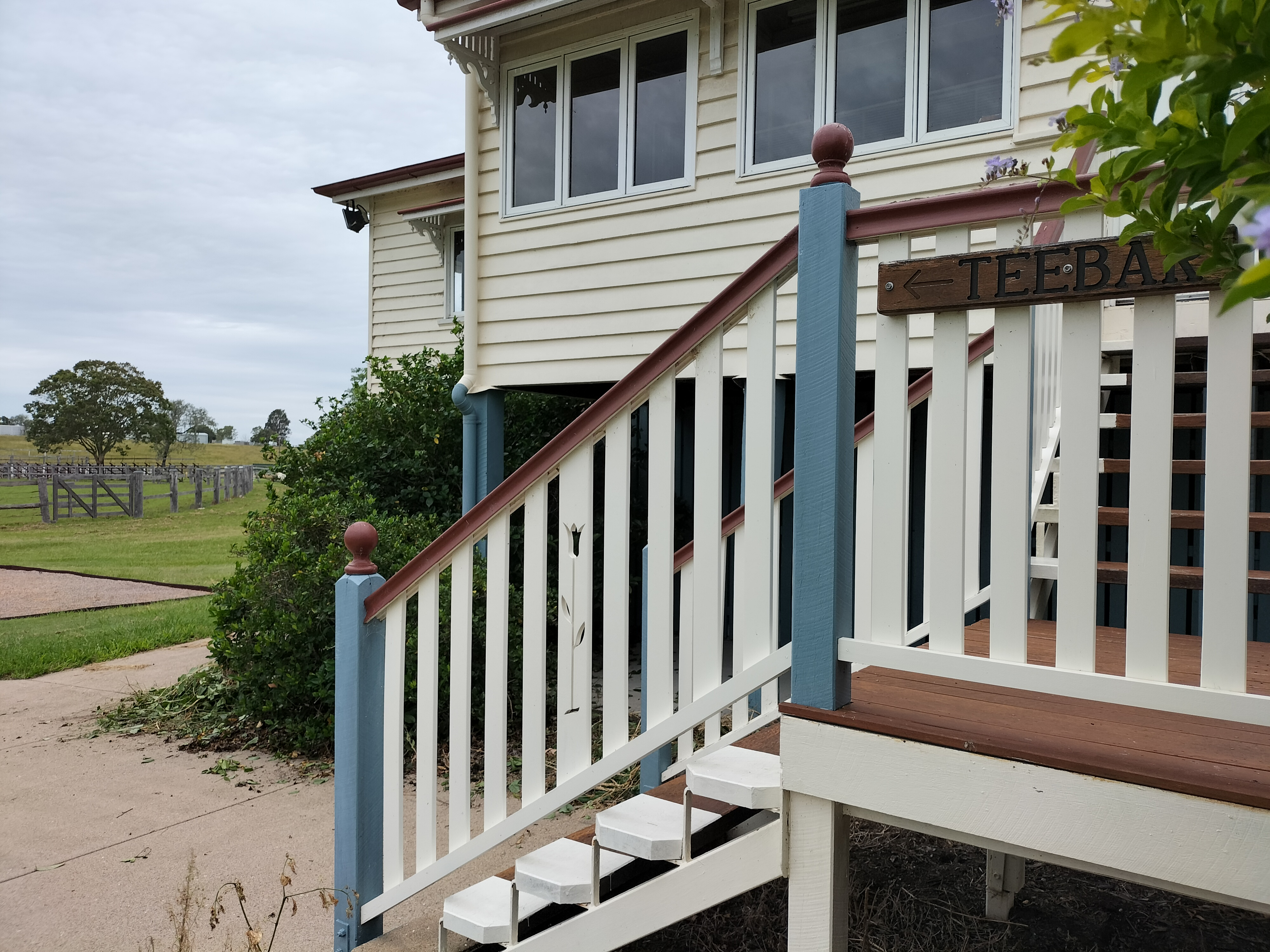
- Teebar Hall with showground in the background, 2023

- Interactive map of Teebar
- Coordinates: 25.6594°S 152.2072°E
- Country: Australia
- State: Queensland
- LGA: Fraser Coast Region
- Location: 55.9 km (34.7 mi) WSW of Maryborough; 85.0 km (52.8 mi) SW of Hervey Bay; 302 km (188 mi) N of Brisbane

Government
  - State electorate: Maryborough
  - Federal division: Wide Bay

Area
  - Total: 67.8 km^{2} (26.2 sq mi)

Population
  - Total: 59 (2021 census)
  - Density: 0.870/km^{2} (2.254/sq mi)
- Time zone: UTC+10:00 (AEST)
- Postcode: 4620
Suburbs around Teebar
Boompa	Boompa	Brooweena
Boompa	Teebar	Gigoomgan
Malarga	Malarga	Gigoomgan

Teebar is a rural locality in the Fraser Coast Region, Queensland, Australia. In the 2021 census, Teebar had a population of 59 people.

== Geography ==
Eel Creek and Sandy Creek form the north-western boundary of the locality. Munna Creek forms the north-eastern boundary. Teebar Creek forms the south-eastern boundary. All of these creeks are ultimately tributaries of the Mary River.

The Brooweena Woolooga Road passes through the locality from south (Malarga) to north (Brooweena). Boompa Road enters the locality from the north-west (Boompa) and terminates at its junction with the Brooweena Woolooga Road in the north-west of the locality.

The principal land use is grazing on native vegetation.

== History ==
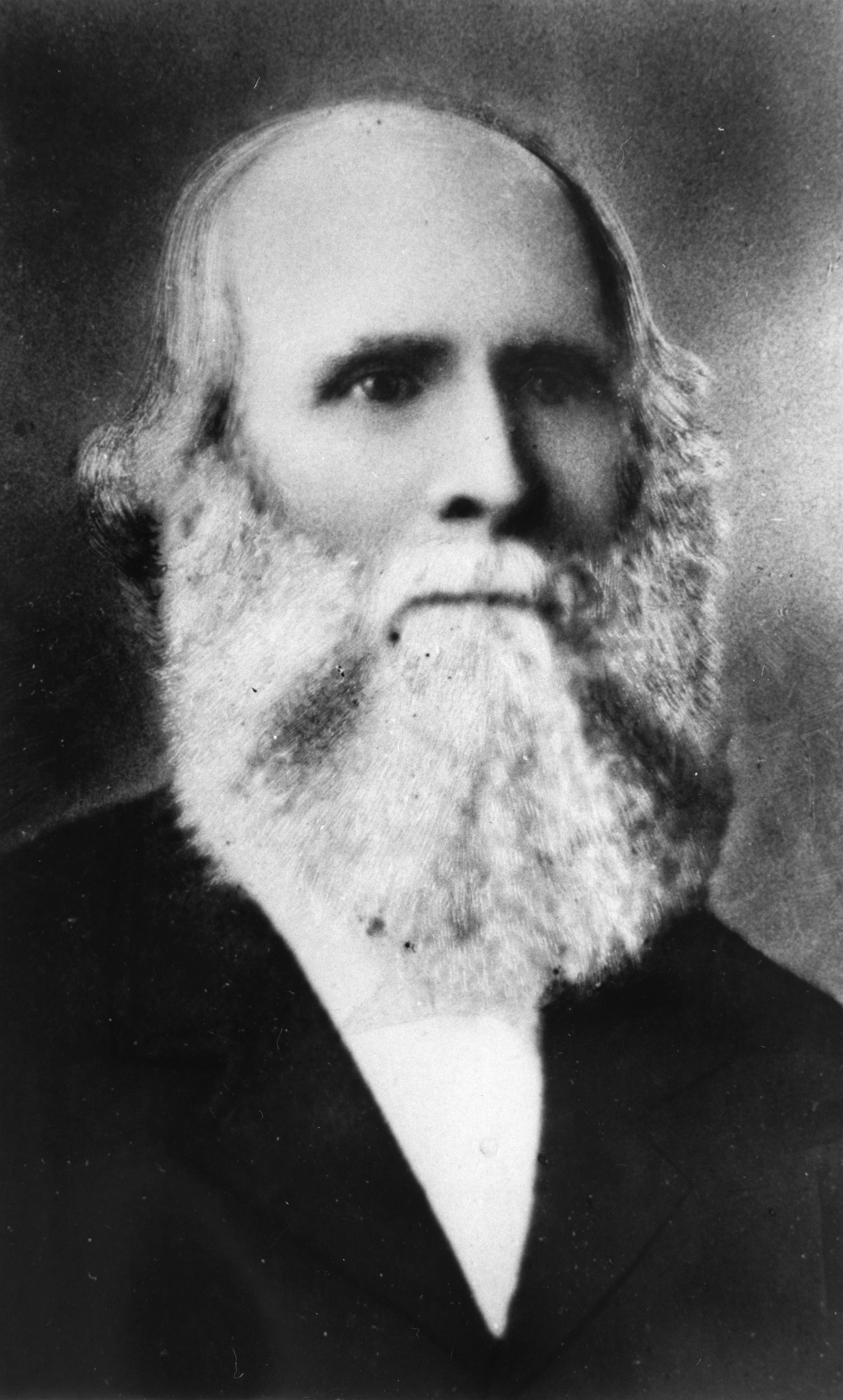
John Eaton (1811-1904), the Squire of Teebar, Queensland, Australia.

The runs of Crown Lands of Teebah, Wycalba, and Yarounbah were transferred during the period from 11 September 1854, to 31 December 1855 from Henry Cox Corfield to John Eaton. John Eaton held Teebar until his death in 1904.

A copper mine and smelter were established in Teebar in 1873 by the Teebar Copper Mining Company Ltd. The location is described as being "north side of Munna Creek one and a half miles west of Clifton Station" and the ruins include a 100-ton slag heap.

In 1887, 58,000 acres (23,000 ha) of land were resumed from the Teebar pastoral run for the establishment of small farms. The land was offered for selection on 17 April 1887.

Teebar East Provisional School opened on 29 May 1893. In 1904, the school was moved and renamed Teebar West Provisional School. On 1 January 1909, it became Teebar West State School. In 1930, the school was again moved to a more central position and in March 1933 was renamed Boompa State School. The school closed on 16 April 1945, but reopened on 25 March 1946. It closed permanently on 28 January 1963.

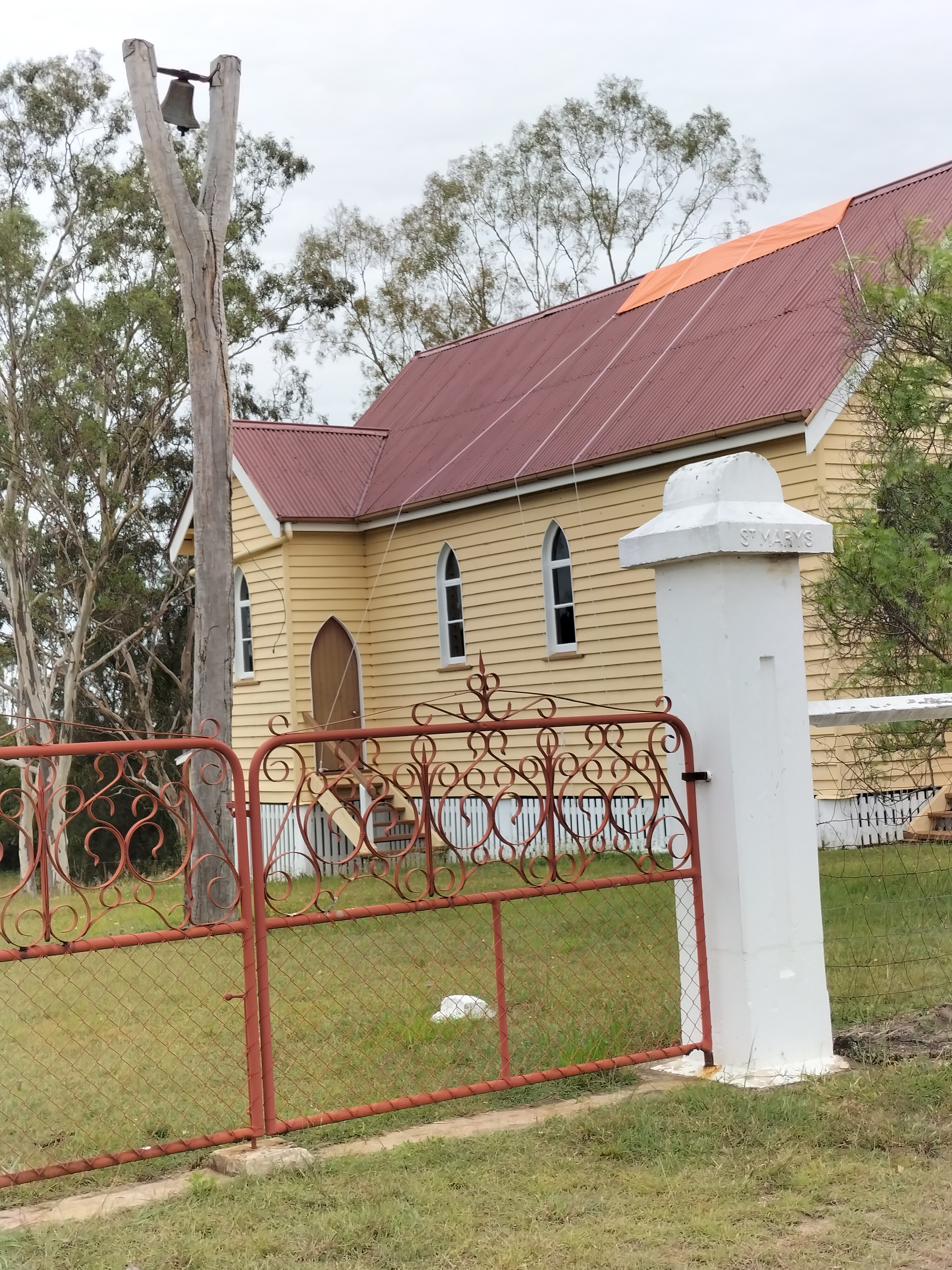
St Mary's Anglican Church, cemetery gates and bell pole, Teebar, Queensland in 2023

Elizabeth Mary Thomas nee Eaton, formerly Mrs B J Nichols, donated land from the property Clifton for a church and cemetery. Subscriptions for the building fund were made on the understanding that the church was dedicated in the name of St Mary to the memory of Woocoo Shire soldiers killed in action in World War I. Opening services of the St Mary's Anglican Church were held on 26 October 1919. The church was built by Matthew Edmund Rooney of Maryborough. There is a group of three stained glass windows behind the altar. In 2019 residents and descendants of past residents attended a 100th anniversary service, and a plaque to commemorate the occasion was unveiled in the church grounds. The church is variously described as being located at Boompa, Brooweena, or Teebar.

In 1922, the residents of the Woocoo Shire erected a war memorial outside St Mary's Church of England on the Maryborough-Biggenden Road at Teebar, (now within Boompa). In 1992, the memorial was relocated to the Woocoo Historical Museum in Brooweena on the north-western corner of Lahey Street and Smith Street (25.60024°S 152.26303°E) due to concerns about vandalism. It is now known as the Brooweena War Memorial.

== Demographics ==
In the 2016 census, Teebar had a population of 43 people.

In the 2021 census, Teebar had a population of 59 people.

== Education ==
There are no schools in Teebar. The nearest government primary school is Brooweena State School in Brooweena to the north-east. The nearest government secondary schools are Aldridge State High School (to Year 10) in Maryborough to the north-east and Biggenden State School (to Year 10) in Biggenden to the north-west. For students too distant to commute to Maryborough daily, the other options are distance education and boarding school.

== Amenities ==
Teebar Hall is on Teebar Hall Road. It is managed by the Fraser Coast Regional Council.

== Events ==
Teebar holds an annual agricultural show which includes a campdraft and rodeo near the northern boundary of the locality.

== Heritage listing ==
Fraser Coast Regional Council has placed the following sites on its Local Heritage Register:

- Teebar Hall and grounds, opened in 1918, at Teebar Hall Road, Teebar
- St Mary’s Church and Cemetery at Maryborough Biggenden Road, Brooweena
