= Gigoomgan =

- Suburb
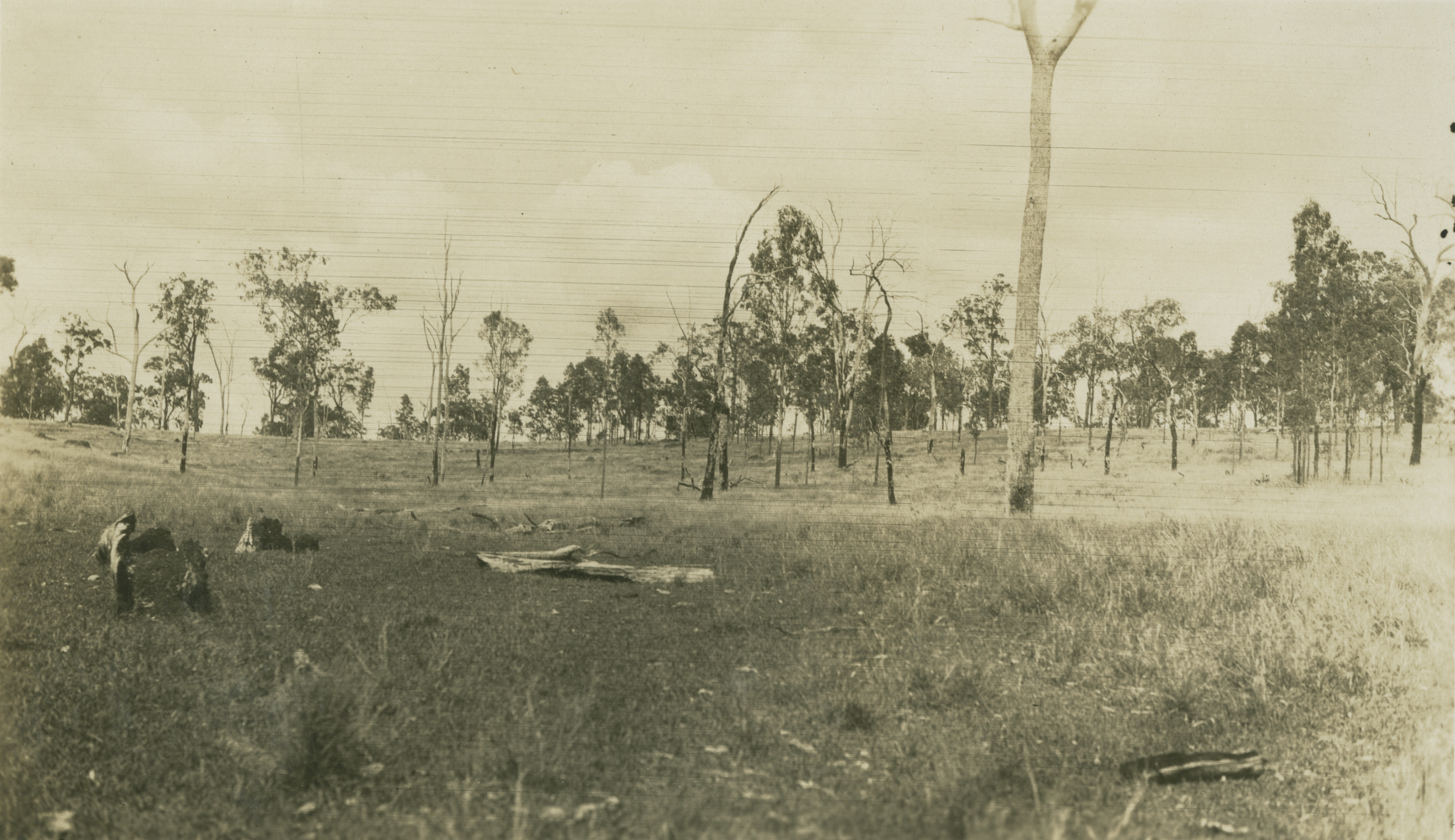
- Gigoomgan district, circa 1929

- Interactive map of Gigoomgan
- Coordinates: 25.765°S 152.2469°E
- Country: Australia
- State: Queensland
- LGA: Fraser Coast Region
- Location: 34.9 km (21.7 mi) SSW of Brooweena; 83.7 km (52.0 mi) SW of Maryborough; 113 km (70 mi) SW of Hervey Bay; 276 km (171 mi) NNW of Brisbane

Government
  - State electorate: Maryborough
  - Federal division: Wide Bay

Area
  - Total: 195.2 km^{2} (75.4 sq mi)

Population
  - Total: 46 (2021 census)
  - Density: 0.2357/km^{2} (0.610/sq mi)
- Time zone: UTC+10:00 (AEST)
- Postcode: 4620
Suburbs around Gigoomgan
Teebar	Brooweena	Woocoo
Malarga	Gigoomgan	Glenbar
Tansey	Calgoa	Marodian

Gigoomgan is a rural locality in the Fraser Coast Region, Queensland, Australia. In the 2021 census, Gigoomgan had a population of 46 people.

== Geography ==
The Burnett Range forms the southern boundary of the locality. Teebar Creek forms the north-western boundary and Munna Creek forms the north-eastern boundary with their confluence at the most northerly point in the locality. Mount Joseph is in the west of the locality (25.75°S 152.2°E), rising to 290 metres (950 ft) above sea level.

Brooweena Woolooga Road enters the locality from the west (Malarga) and exits to the south-east (Marodian).

The Gigoomgan State Forest is in the west of the locality and Grongah National Park is in the south-east of the locality. Apart from these protected areas, the land use is predominantly grazing on native vegetation.

== History ==
The locality is thought to take its name from the parish name, which is an Aboriginal word from the Kabi language, gigamgan, meaning the place of white cockatoos.

In 1887, 68,480 acres (27,710 ha) of land were resumed from the Gigoomgan consolidated pastoral run for the establishment of small farms. The land was offered for selection on 17 April 1887.

== Demographics ==
In the 2016 census, Gigoomgan had a population of 34 people.

In the 2021 census, Gigoomgan had a population of 46 people.

== Education ==
There are no schools in Gigoomgan. The nearest government primary school is Brooweena State School in neighbouring Brooweena to the north. The nearest government secondary school is Aldridge State High School in Maryborough, but could be too distant for a daily commute for students living in the southern and central parts of Gigoomgan. The alternatives are distance education and boarding school.
