= Boompa, Queensland =

Boompa
- Suburb
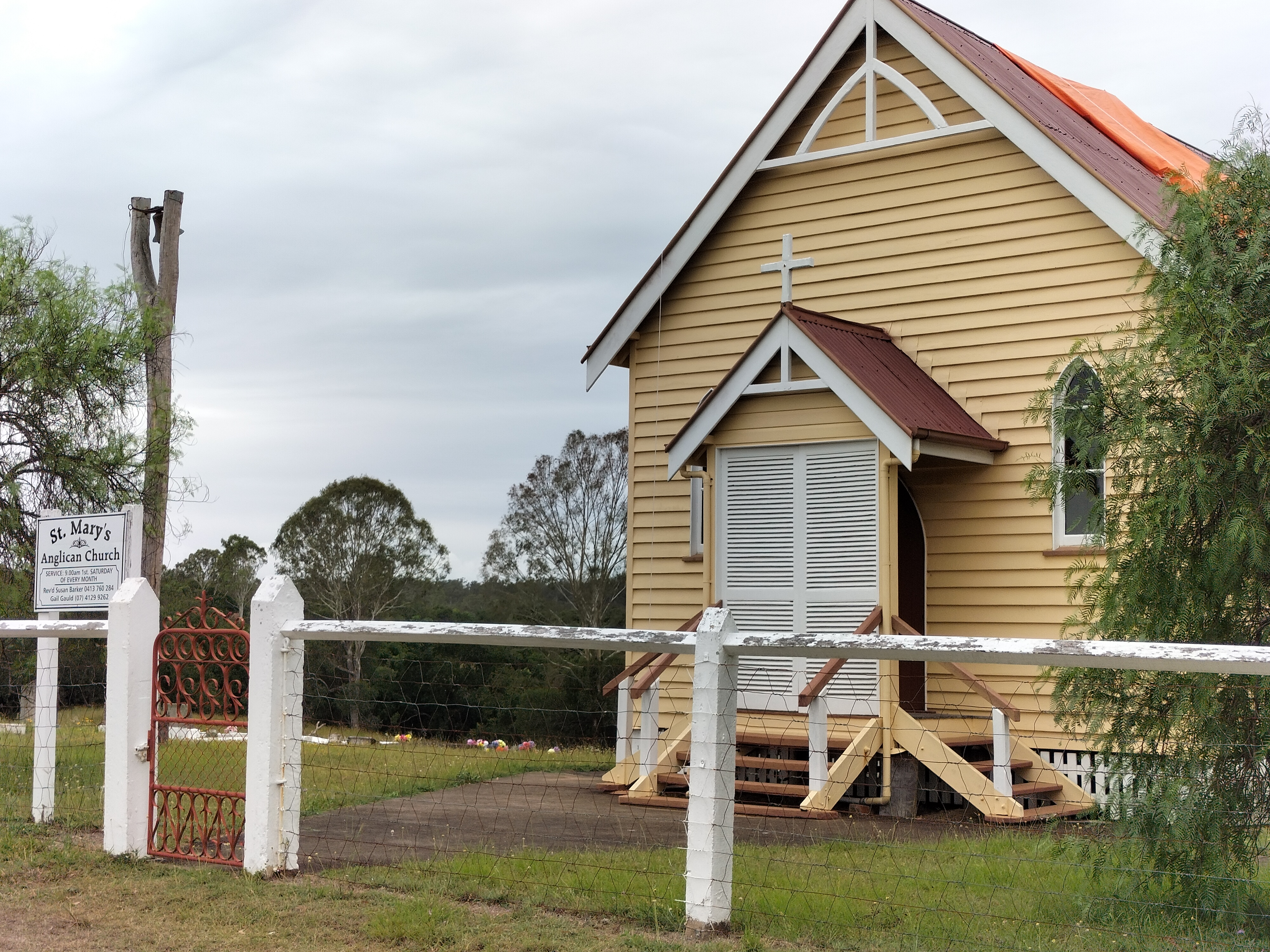
- St Mary's Anglican Church, 2023

- Interactive map of Boompa
- Coordinates: 25.635°S 152.1427°E
- Country: Australia
- State: Queensland
- LGA: Fraser Coast Region
- Location: 18.6 km (11.6 mi) SE of Biggenden; 66.5 km (41.3 mi) W of Maryborough; 95.5 km (59.3 mi) WSW of Hervey Bay; 311 km (193 mi) NNW of Brisbane

Government
  - State electorate: Maryborough
  - Federal division: Wide Bay

Area
  - Total: 312.2 km^{2} (120.5 sq mi)

Population
  - Total: 89 (2021 census)
  - Density: 0.2851/km^{2} (0.738/sq mi)
- Time zone: UTC+10:00 (AEST)
- Postcode: 4621
Suburbs around Boompa
| Lakeside | Golden Fleece | Brooweena |
| Biggenden | Boompa | Teebar |
| Stockhaven | Booubyjan | Malarga |

Boompa is a rural locality in the Fraser Coast Region, Queensland, Australia. In the 2021 census, Boompa had a population of 89 people.

== History ==
Teebar East Provisional School opened on 29 May 1893. In 1904, the school was moved and renamed Teebar West Provisional School. On 1 January 1909, it became Teebar West State School. In 1930, the school was again moved to a more central position and in March 1933 was renamed Boompa State School. The school closed on 16 April 1945, but reopened on 25 March 1946. It closed permanently on 28 January 1963.

In 1922, the residents of the Woocoo Shire erected a war memorial outside St Mary's Church of England on the Maryborough-Biggenden Road at Teebar (now within Boompa). In 1992, the memorial was relocated to the Woocoo Historical Museum in Brooweena due to concerns about vandalism. It is now known as the Brooweena War Memorial.

Elizabeth Mary Thomas nee Eaton, formerly Mrs B J Nichols, donated land from the property Clifton for a church and cemetery. Subscription towards the building fund were made on the understanding that the church was dedicated in the name of St Mary to the memory of Woocoo Shire soldiers killed in action in World War I. Opening services of the St Mary's Anglican Church were held on 26 October 1919. The church was built by Matthew Edmund Rooney of Maryborough. There is a group of three stained glass windows behind the altar. In 2019 residents and descendants of past residents attended a 100th anniversary service, and a plaque to commemorate the occasion was unveiled in the church grounds. The church is variously described as being located at Boompa, Brooweena, or Teebar.

== Demographics ==
In the 2016 census, Boompa had a population of 83 people.

In the 2021 census, Boompa had a population of 89 people.

== Heritage listing ==
Fraser Coast Regional Council placed the St Mary’s Church and Cemetery on its Local Heritage Register.

== Education ==
There are no schools in Boompa. The nearest government primary schools are Brooweena State School in neighbouring Brooweena to the north-east, Biggenden State School in neighbouring Biggenden to the north-west, and Coalstoun Lakes State School in Coalstoun Lakes to the west. The nearest government secondary schools include Biggenden State School (to Year 10). For secondary schooling to Year 12, the nearest government schools are Aldridge State High School in Maryborough to the east, Isis District State High School in Childers to the north, and Burnett State College in Gayndah to the west, but most of Boompa is too distant from these three schools for a daily commute, so the alternatives for Year 12 schooling are distance education and boarding school.

== Facilities ==
There is a cemetery beside St Mary's Anglican Church (25.6158°S 152.2346°E).
