= Brooweena, Queensland =

Brooweena
- Town
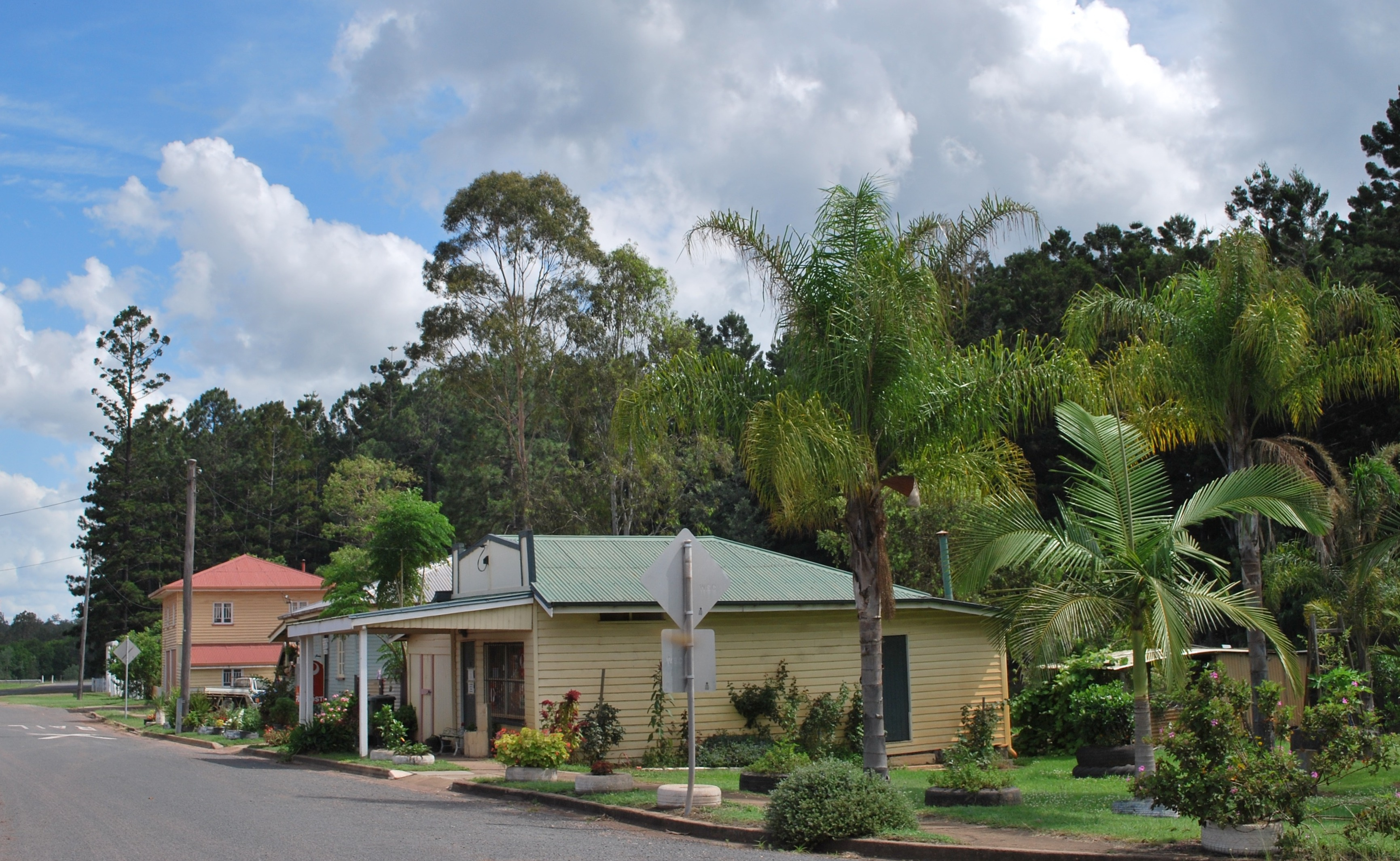
- Main street of Brooweena, with the post office in the foreground, 2008

- Interactive map of Brooweena
- Coordinates: 25.6016°S 152.2633°E
- Country: Australia
- State: Queensland
- LGA: Fraser Coast Region
- Location: 48.8 km (30.3 mi) W of Maryborough; 77.8 km (48.3 mi) SW of Hervey Bay; 295 km (183 mi) N of Brisbane
- Established: 1889

Government
  - State electorate: Maryborough
  - Federal division: Wide Bay

Area
  - Total: 84.5 km^{2} (32.6 sq mi)

Population
  - Total: 91 (2021 census)
  - Density: 1.077/km^{2} (2.789/sq mi)
- Time zone: UTC+10:00 (AEST)
- Postcode: 4620
Localities around Brooweena
Golden Fleece	Golden Fleece	North Aramara
Boompa	Brooweena	Aramara
Teebar	Gigoomgan	Woocoo

Brooweena is a rural town and locality in the Fraser Coast Region, Queensland, Australia. In the 2021 census, the locality of Brooweena had a population of 91 people.

== Geography ==
The town is located in the Wide Bay–Burnett area and is 266 kilometres (165 mi) north of the state capital, Brisbane. It is on the Maryborough–Biggenden Road. The north-west of the locality includes a large portion of the Wongi National Park and the Wongi State Forest.

== History ==
The name Brooweena is believed to be an Aboriginal word meaning crab.

The town was established following the arrival of the Mungar Junction to Monto Branch Railway in 1889.

Brooweena Post Office opened on 23 December 1889.

Braemar Provisional School opened on 21 January 1901. It closed in 1922 due to low attendances. It reopened in 1924 and closed on 1 July 1935 and the students were transferred to the newly opened Woocoo State School (which closed in 1961). Braemar is the name of a pastoral property south of Brooweena.

Brooweena Provisional School opened on 21 March 1904; the first teacher was Eugenie Eveline Hay. It was upgraded to a State School in 1909.

Ballugan Provisional School opened on 12 November 1907. On 1 January 1909, it became Ballugan State School. It closed in December 1909 but reopened in August 1910. It closed permanently on 30 June 1911.

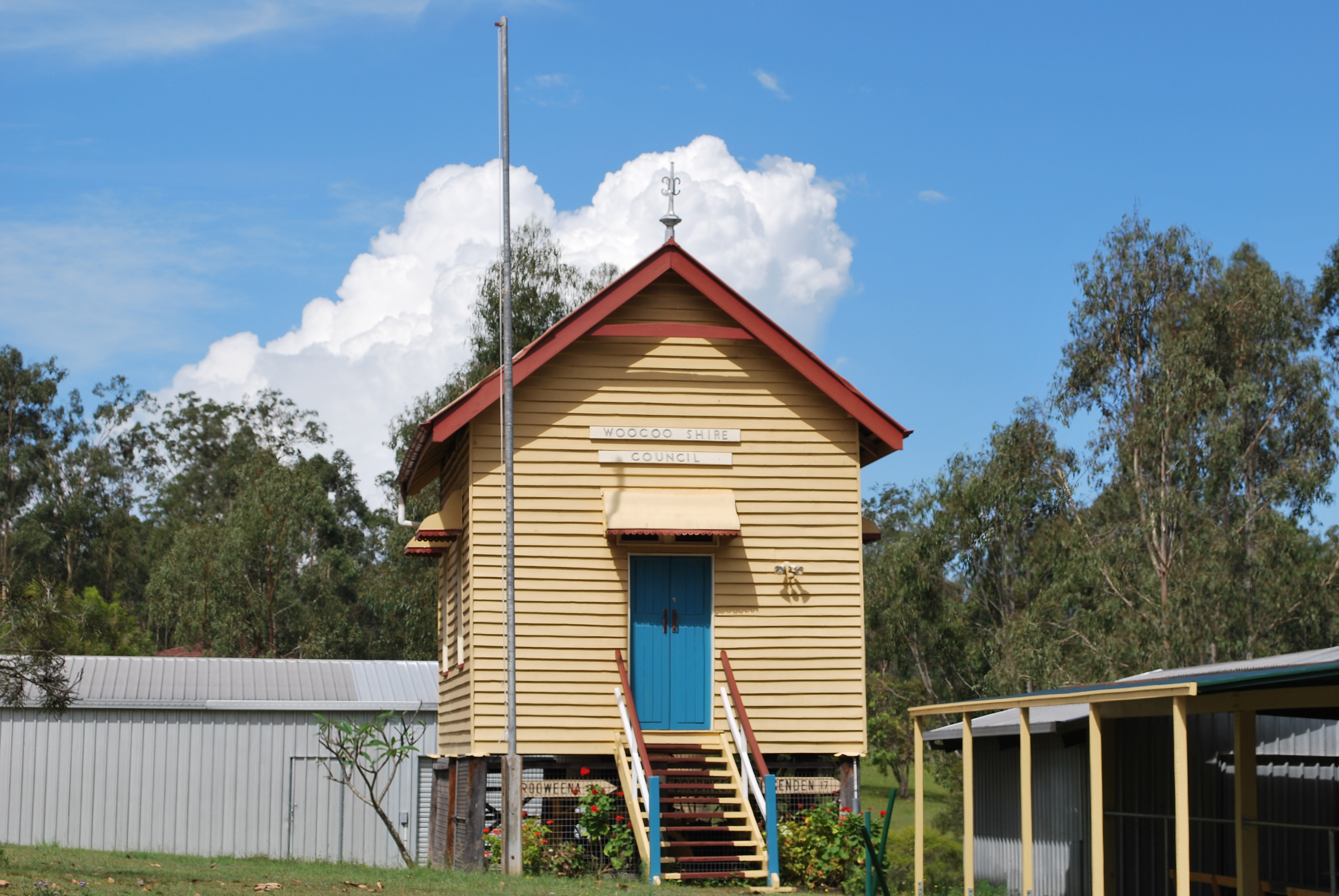
Woocoo Shire Chambers, 2008

In 1915, the chambers of the newly established Shire of Woocoo were constructed in the town. This small building survives to this day as part of the Early Settlers Museum operated by the Woocoo Historical Society.

Elizabeth Mary Thomas née Eaton, formerly Mrs B J Nichols, donated land from the property Clifton for a church and cemetery. Subscription towards the building fund were made on the understanding that the church was dedicated in the name of St Mary to the memory of Woocoo Shire soldiers killed in action in World War I. Opening services of the St Mary's Anglican Church were held on 26 October 1919. The church was built by Matthew Edmund Rooney of Maryborough. There is a group of three stained glass windows behind the altar. In 2019 residents and descendants of past residents attended a 100th anniversary service, and a plaque to commemorate the occasion was unveiled in the church grounds. The church is variously described as being located at Boompa, Brooweena, or Teebar.

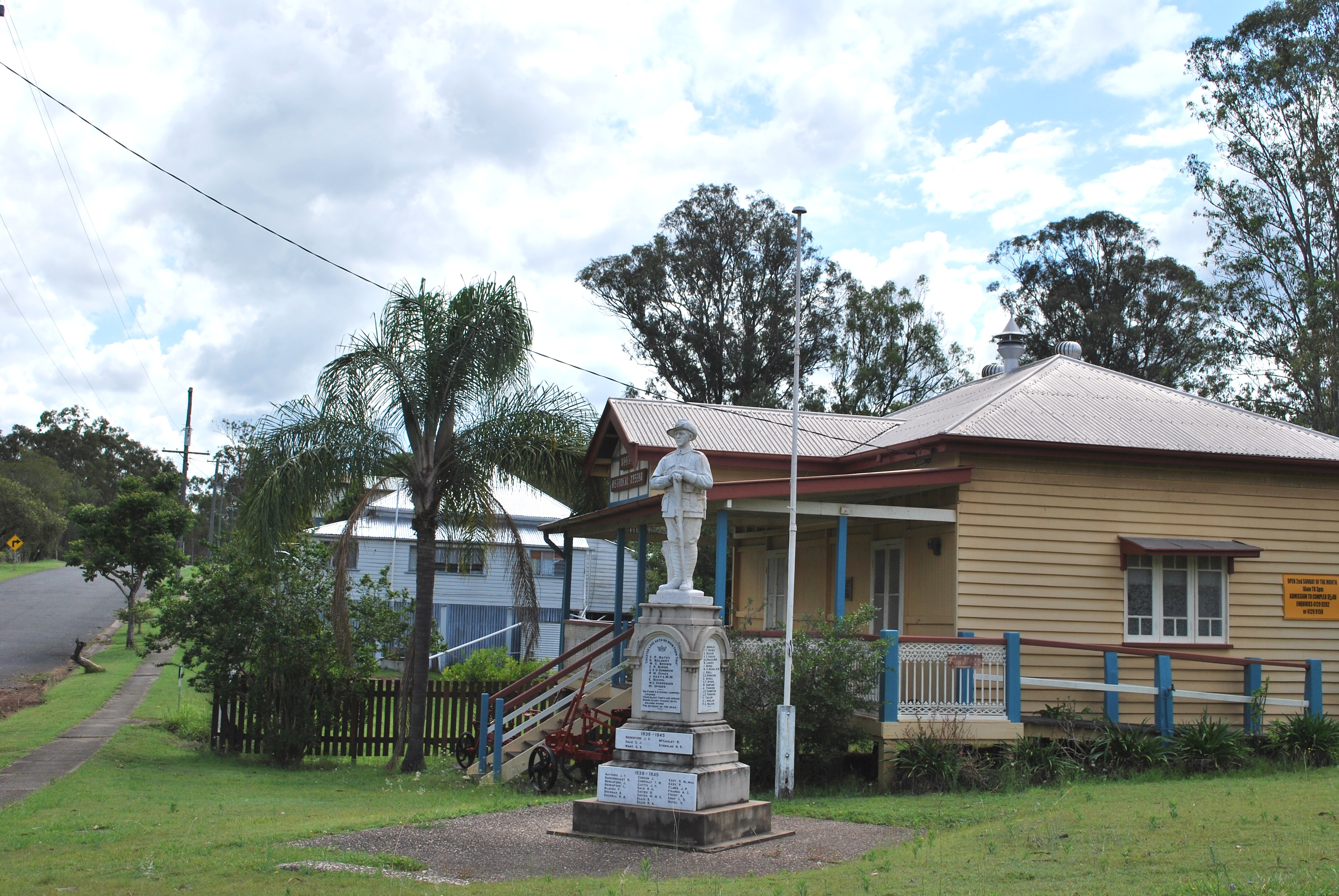
Brooweena War Memorial, 2008

In 1922, the residents of the Woocoo Shire erected a war memorial outside St Mary's Church of England on the Maryborough-Biggenden Road at Teebar (now within Boompa). In 1992 the memorial was relocated to the Woocoo Historical Museum in Brooweena on the north-western corner of Lahey Street and Smith Street (25.60024°S 152.26303°E) due to concerns about vandalism. It is now known as the Brooweena War Memorial.

A timber mill was established in 1924, ensuring the continuing existence of the town by being its major employer. The mill was destroyed in a fire in 1988 and was rebuilt by local people. On Thursday 28 November 2013 the mill closed as it was no longer compliant with modern safety standards and the cost of modernising the mill would be millions of dollars. After Robertson Bros Sawmills sold the Brooweena mill to Ken Hall, it was reopened in 2017.

Idalia Provisional School opened on 20 July 1931 and closed on 16 April 1939.

New council chambers were opened in Brooweena on 14 April 1962 by Jack Pizzey, the Member of the Queensland Legislative Assembly for Isis.

The town set an unofficial record in 2009 when 134 people simultaneously played the lagerphone.

== Demographics ==
In the 2011 census, the locality of Brooweena and surrounds had a population of 263 people.

In the 2016 census, the locality of Brooweena had a population of 104 people.

In the 2021 census, the locality of Brooweena had a population of 91 people.

== Heritage listings ==
Brooweena has a number of heritage-listed sites, including:

- War Memorial Bridge, Brooweena-Woolooga Road
- Brooweena War Memorial, Smith Crescent

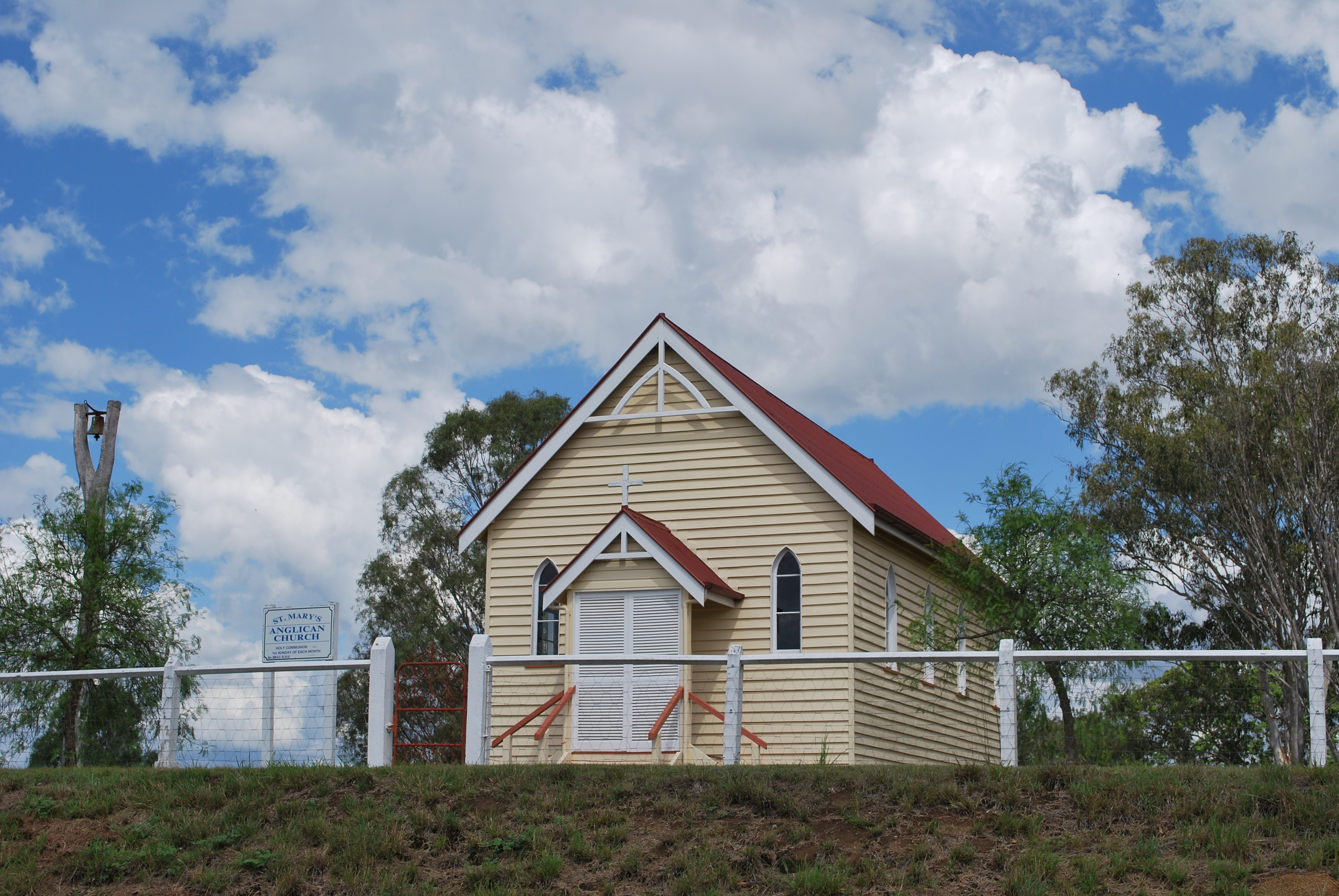
St Mary's Anglican Church, Brooweena, Queensland, Australia 2008

Additionally, Fraser Coast Regional Council has placed the following sites on its Local Heritage Register:

- Brooweena Sawmill, Corfield Street
- Mount Joseph Three Rail Fence, Brooweena Woolooga Road
- Woocoo Historical Society, Smith Crescent
- St Mary's Church and Cemetery, Maryborough Biggenden Road

== Education ==
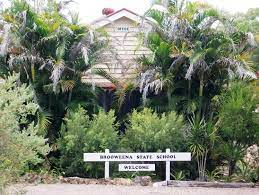
Brooweena State School, 2024

Brooweena State School is a government primary (Prep-6) school for boys and girls at Lahey Street (25.5989°S 152.2610°E). In 2017, ACARA (Australian Curriculum, Assessment and Reporting Authority) reported an enrolment of 12 students with 2 teachers (1 full-time equivalent) and 4 non-teaching staff (2 full-time equivalent). In 2018, the school had an enrolment of 14 students with 2 teachers (1 full-time equivalent) and 4 non-teaching staff (2 full-time equivalent).

There are no secondary schools in Brooweena. The nearest government secondary schools are Aldridge State High School (to Year 12) in Maryborough to the east, Isis District State High School (to Year 12) in Childers to the north, and Biggenden State School (to Year 10) in Biggenden to the north-west.
