= Wateranga, Queensland =

Wateranga
- Suburb
- Interactive map of Wateranga
- Coordinates: 25.3816°S 151.8302°E
- Country: Australia
- State: Queensland
- LGA: North Burnett Region
- Location: 28.1 km (17.5 mi) NW of Biggenden; 49.7 km (30.9 mi) NE of Gayndah; 113 km (70 mi) WNW of Maryborough; 116 km (72 mi) SW of Bundaberg; 345 km (214 mi) NNW of Brisbane

Government
  - State electorate: Callide
  - Federal division: Flynn

Area
  - Total: 101.7 km^{2} (39.3 sq mi)

Population
  - Total: 0 (2021 census)
  - Density: 0.000/km^{2} (0.000/sq mi)
- Time zone: UTC+10:00 (AEST)
- Postcode: 4621
Suburbs around Wateranga
Mingo	Mingo	Good Night
Mingo	Wateranga	Coringa
Mount Steadman	Didcot	Didcot

Wateranga is a rural locality in the North Burnett Region, Queensland, Australia. In the 2021 census, Wateranga had "no people or a very low population".

== Geography ==
The Burnett River forms the western and northern boundaries. This part of the river is also known as Lake Paradise, the impoundment of the river by the Paradise Dam further downstream between Goodnight and Coringa to the north-east.

Scrubby Top is a mountain in the north-west of the locality (25.3693°S 151.8137°E), rising to 176 metres (577 ft) above sea level.

The land use is grazing on native vegetation.

== Demographics ==
In the 2016 census, Wateranga had "no people or a very low population".

In the 2021 census, Wateranga had "no people or a very low population".

== Education ==
There are no schools in Wateranga. The nearest government primary schools are Dallarnil State School in Dallarnil to the east, Biggenden State School in Biggenden to the south-east, and Coalstoun Lakes State School in Coalstoun Lakes to the south. The nearest government secondary schools are Biggenden State School (to Year 10) and Burnett State College (to Year 12) in Gayndah to the south-east. There is also a Catholic primary school in Gayndah.
