= Queensland Aquatic Macroinvertebrate Collection =

The Aquatic Macroinvertebrate Collection is a Queensland Government scientific collection based in Queensland, Australia. The collection consists of aquatic macroinvertebrate (large invertebrates) specimens from rivers, streams, springs, wetlands, and other freshwater sources in Queensland.

The distribution of sampling sites is extensive and covers many bioregions and most river catchments in Queensland – from the arid and semi-arid dryland rivers of the Lake Eyre basin, to the Wet Tropics and monsoonal areas of northern Queensland. As such, the collection is considered invaluable by the Queensland Government for many environmental decisions as it offers an environmental benchmark for future economic development. The collection and associated data continue to support water planning and environmental impact assessment decisions.

The Aquatic Macroinvertebrate Collection supports activities integral to the:

- Biosecurity Act 2015
- Environment Protection and Biodiversity Conservation Act 1999
- Queensland Environmental Protection Act 1994

== History and current use ==
The collection started in the mid-1990s as a legacy of both past and ongoing river condition or health monitoring programs in Queensland. As many samples were collected prior to the construction of dams these samples represent an irreplaceable record of past freshwater ecosystem biodiversity.

The Aquatic Macroinvertebrate Collection is a unique geo-referenced resource of freshwater aquatic macroinvertebrate fauna, with around 3500 individual samples. Furthermore, the specimens in this collection are not stored taxonomically but arranged by river system.

Individual animals in the collection are generally identified to the family level by trained scientists, and the resulting data is quality assured, and ISO certified. While the physical collection is stored by geographical location, the digital database enables for the location of a taxonomic sample, if required.

== Importance of the collection ==
The biodiversity in Queensland's rivers and other freshwater systems is unique, consisting of a massive diversity of insects, spiders, crabs, snails and mussels, as well as a variety of worms and sponges.

The strength of the Aquatic Macroinvertebrate Collection being curated by location and not taxa is that species assemblages are one of the best methods to determine the health of an aquatic ecosystem. Insect larvae, clams, sponges and small invertebrates together are indicator species that need very specific conditions to thrive. Therefore, the prevalence of a specific species or the absence of a characteristic group allows for an accurate assessment of the health of a body of water and for use in bioregion water quality assessment.

In Queensland, this knowledge is used for the creation and monitoring of freshwater bioregions. Part of the aquatic macroinvertebrate collection stems from such analysis and can be used to benchmark current development against a historic stable. For example, the creation of the Paradise Dam on the Burnett River or the Walla Weir (now known as the Ned Churchward Weir) on the Burnett River at Bungadoo changed the whole aquatic ecosystem. The degree to which this change might negatively influence the river ecosystem can be assessed through the samples in the collection.
