= Wilson Valley, Queensland =

Wilson Valley
- Suburb
- Interactive map of Wilson Valley
- Coordinates: 25.5525°S 151.8538°E
- Country: Australia
- State: Queensland
- LGA: North Burnett Region
- Location: 25.2 km (15.7 mi) SW of Biggenden; 34.4 km (21.4 mi) ENE of Gayndah; 110 km (68 mi) W of Maryborough; 128 km (80 mi) WSW of Hervey Bay; 327 km (203 mi) NNW of Brisbane

Government
  - State electorate: Callide
  - Federal division: Flynn

Area
  - Total: 38.1 km^{2} (14.7 sq mi)

Population
  - Total: 20 (2021 census)
  - Density: 0.52/km^{2} (1.4/sq mi)
- Time zone: UTC+10:00 (AEST)
- Postcode: 4625
Suburbs around Wilson Valley
Gooroolba	Didcot	Didcot
Gooroolba	Wilson Valley	Didcot
Ginoondan	Coalstoun Lakes	Coalstoun Lakes

Wilson Valley is a rural locality in the North Burnett Region, Queensland, Australia. In the 2021 census, Wilson Valley had a population of 20 people.

== Geography ==
The locality is loosely bounded from the north to the south-east by the Bin Bin Range.

The terrain varies from 150 to 360 metres (490 to 1,180 ft) above sea level with the higher elevations near the Bin Bin Range and the lower elevations in the south-west of the locality. The land use is grazing on native vegetation.

== History ==
The locality takes its name from its school, which was named Wilson Valley after Sam Wilson, described as the "founder of the valley" and who was then enlisted for military service in World War I.

Although approval to establish the school was refused in July 1916 due to some of the students leaving the district resulting in too few students for the 18 required to establish a school, Mr J. Stines offered to building a provisional school building at his own expanse on his own land, an offer accepted by the government. Wilson Valley Provisional School opened on 4 October 1916 under teacher Mrs W. Brown junior. In June 1918, the government agreed to erect a state school building. On 1 October 1918, it became Wilson Valley State School. In 1930, a new school building was erected at the school, and in 1931, the old school building was relocated to Abercorn State School. The school closed on 14 May 1944. It was on Fowlers Road (25.55058°S 151.83853°E).

== Demographics ==
In the 2016 census, Wilson Valley had a population of 14 people.

In the 2021 census, Wilson Valley had a population of 20 people.

== Education ==
There are no schools in Wilson Valley. The nearest government primary school is Coalstoun Lakes State School in neighbouring Coalstoun Lakes to the south-east. The nearest government secondary schools are Biggenden State School (to Year 10) in Biggenden to the east and Burnett State College (to Year 12) in Gayndah to the south-west.
