= Paradise, Queensland =

Paradise Coringa, Queensland
- Wesleyan Methodist parsonage (left) and church (right), 1892
- Coordinates: 25.3533°S 151.9208°E
- Postcode(s): 4621
- Time zone: AEST (UTC+10:00)
- Location: 33.6 km (21 mi) NW of Biggenden; 50.4 km (31 mi) SW of Childers; 68.9 km (43 mi) NE of Gayndah; 96.6 km (60 mi) SW of Bundaberg; 359 km (223 mi) NNW of Brisbane
- LGA(s): North Burnett Region
- State electorate(s): Callide
- Federal division(s): Flynn

Paradise is a town on the Burnett River, in Queensland, Australia, within the present-day locality of Coringa in the North Burnett Region. Although it is still officially gazetted as a town, the town no longer has buildings or people.

== History ==
The town was established as a gold mining centre and was abandoned once the gold ran out. The main reef on the goldfield extended for two miles along Finneys Creek.

A post office opened on 3 April 1890 and closed about June 1905.

A town reserve was proclaimed on 20 July 1891.

Paradise Provisional School opened about 1892 and closed in 1904. It was at 25.3542°S 151.9206°E. In December 1905, tenders were called to relocate the school building to Mount Shamrock.

The Paradise Public Hall was relocated to Mount Shamrock where it was officially reopened circa September 1905.

The town site is partially inundated by Lake Paradise, formed by the construction of Paradise Dam on the Burnett River. Prior to inundation, an archaeological excavation of the town site was conducted by the University of Queensland archaeological services unit, revealing much about life in Queensland gold rush towns.

== See also ==
- List of ghost towns
