= Gooroolba =

- Town
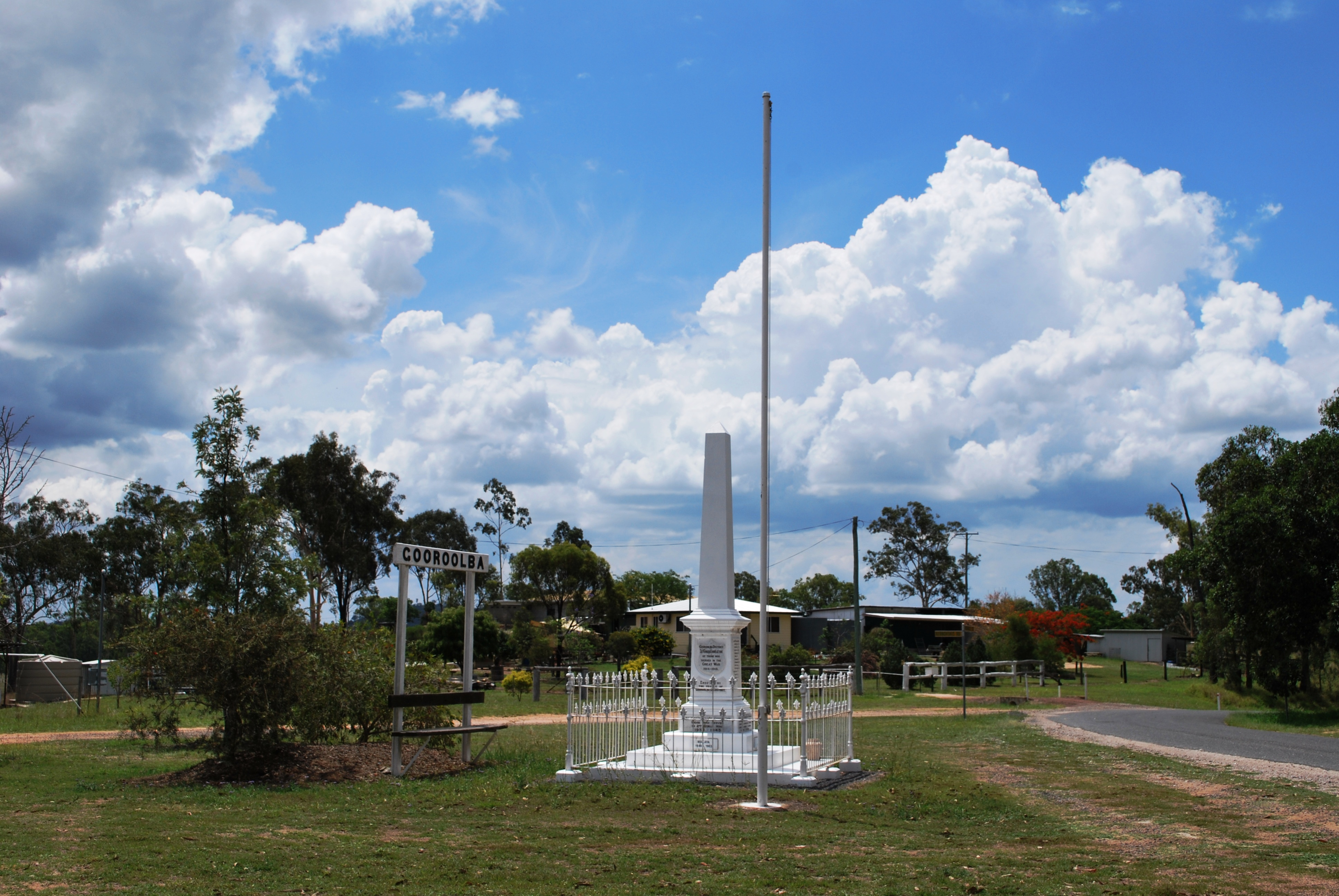
- War memorial

- Interactive map of Gooroolba
- Coordinates: 25.5163°S 151.8080°E
- Country: Australia
- State: Queensland
- LGA: North Burnett Region
- Location: 26.9 km (16.7 mi) NE of Gayndah; 31.6 km (19.6 mi) W of Biggenden; 116 km (72 mi) W of Maryborough; 120 km (75 mi) SW of Bundaberg; 322 km (200 mi) NNW of Brisbane

Government
  - State electorate: Callide
  - Federal division: Flynn

Area
  - Total: 31.3 km^{2} (12.1 sq mi)

Population
  - Total: 21 (2021 census)
  - Density: 0.671/km^{2} (1.74/sq mi)
- Time zone: UTC+10:00 (AEST)
- Postcode: 4625
Localities around Gooroolba
Wetheron	Mount Steadman	Didcot
Byrnestown	Gooroolba	Didcot
Ginoondan	Ginoondan	Wilson Valley

Gooroolba is a rural locality in the North Burnett Region, Queensland, Australia. In the 2021 census, the locality of Gooroolba had a population of 21 people.

== Geography ==
Gooroolba is in the Wide Bay–Burnett region 326 kilometres (203 mi) north of the state capital Brisbane.

The Bin Bin Range loosely forms the north-eastern boundary of the locality.

The Gooroolba Biggenden Road enters the locality from the south-west (Byrnestown) and exits to the north-east (Didcot).

The land use is grazing on native vegetation with some rural residential housing.

== History ==
The town's name is an abbreviation of the parish name of Gooroolballin, in turn named after the "Gooroolballan" sheep station. Gooroolballan station was established by at least 1857.

The extension of the Degilbo to Wetheron in 1906 brought the railway to Gooroolba. A tender was let for construction of a state school in the town in 1910.

Gooroolba Post Office opened by June 1910 (a receiving office had been open from 1907) and closed in 1973.

Gooroolba State School opened on 18 April 1911. It closed in 1964.

Mingo Crossing Provisional School opened circa July 1913 and was renamed Fleetwood Provisional School later that year. Allawah Provisional School opened on 7 July 1913. The two schools operated as half-time schools, sharing a single teacher between them. Fleetwood Provisional School closed circa 1915 with Allawah Provisional School becoming a full-time school until it closed in 1917.

In 1917, a cyclone caused significant damage to the town, destroying the public hall and partially wrecking the hotel and two private stores.

The Gooroolba War Memorial is located near the railway crossing. Originally erected to commemorate those who served in World War I, the names of those who served in World War II were added later.

== Demographics ==
In the 2016 census, the locality of Gooroolba had a population of 12 people.

In the 2021 census, the locality of Gooroolba had a population of 21 people.

== Education ==
There are no schools in Gooroolba. The nearest government primary schools are Coalstoun Lakes State School in Coalstoun Lakes to the south-east and Gayndah State School in Gayndah to south-west. The nearest government secondary schools are Burnett State College (to Year 12) in Gayndah and Biggenden State School (to Year 10) in Biggenden to the east.
