= Golden Fleece, Queensland =

Golden Fleece
- Suburb
- Interactive map of Golden Fleece
- Coordinates: 25.4483°S 152.1927°E
- Country: Australia
- State: Queensland
- LGA: North Burnett Region
- Location: 28.2 km (17.5 mi) SW of Childers; 33.8 km (21.0 mi) NE of Biggenden; 87.6 km (54.4 mi) NE of Gayndah; 88.5 km (55.0 mi) WNW of Maryborough; 344 km (214 mi) NW of Brisbane

Government
  - State electorate: Callide
  - Federal division: Flynn

Area
  - Total: 244.1 km^{2} (94.2 sq mi)

Population
  - Total: 45 (2021 census)
  - Density: 0.1844/km^{2} (0.477/sq mi)
- Time zone: UTC+10:00 (AEST)
- Postcode: 4621
Suburbs around Golden Fleece
Booyal	Eureka	Kullogum
Dallarnil; Woowoonga	Golden Fleece	Doongul
Lakeside	Boompa; Brooweena	North Aramara

Golden Fleece is a rural locality in the North Burnett Region, Queensland, Australia. In the 2021 census, Golden Fleece had a population of 45 people.

== Geography ==
The western boundary of the locality follows the ridge line of the Woowoonga Range. Golden Fleece Creek rises in the south of the locality and Boundary Creek rises in the west of the locality. From their confluence in the north-east of the locality the creek becomes known as Sandy Creek which flows north into Eureka.

The Isis Highway passes through the locality from north (Eureka) to north-west (Dallarnil).

The south-east of the locality is within the Wongi National Park and the Wongi State Forest. Apart from those, the principal land use is grazing.

== Demographics ==
In the 2016 census, Golden Fleece had a population of 49 people.

In the 2021 census, Golden Fleece had a population of 45 people.

== Education ==
There are no schools in Golden Fleece. The nearest government primary schools are Dallarnil State School in neighbouring Dallarnil to the west, Biggenden State School in Biggenden to the south-west, and Brooweena State School in neighbouring Brooweena to the south. The nearest government secondary schools are Biggenden State School (to Year 10) in Biggenden to the south, Isis District State High School (to Year 12) in Childers to the north-east, and Aldridge State High School (to Year 12) in Maryborough to the east.
