= Coringa, Queensland =

Coringa
- Suburb
- Interactive map of Coringa
- Coordinates: 25.3775°S 151.9649°E
- Country: Australia
- State: Queensland
- LGA: North Burnett Region
- Location: 21.8 km (13.5 mi) N of Biggenden; 43.5 km (27.0 mi) SW of Childers; 57.1 km (35.5 mi) NE of Gayndah; 89.7 km (55.7 mi) SW of Bundaberg; 356 km (221 mi) NNW of Brisbane

Government
  - State electorate: Callide
  - Federal division: Flynn

Area
  - Total: 130.9 km^{2} (50.5 sq mi)

Population
  - Total: 86 (2021 census)
  - Density: 0.657/km^{2} (1.702/sq mi)
- Time zone: UTC+10:00 (AEST)
- Postcode: 4621
Suburbs around Coringa
Good Night	Good Night	Dallarnil
Wateranga	Coringa	Dallarnil
Didcot	Degilbo	Dallarnil

Coringa is a rural locality in the North Burnett Region, Queensland, Australia. In the 2021 census, Coringa had a population of 86 people.

== Geography ==
The Burnett River forms the northern boundary of the locality. At the west of the locality is the Paradise Dam (25.3503°S 151.9189°E) which creates Lake Paradise. The filling of the dam flooded most of the former town of Paradise (25.3533°S 151.9208°E).

== History ==
The town of Paradise was established in 1889 as a gold mining township. It was on the Burnett River. The town reserve was established on 20 July 1891. In 1898, the town was abandoned when the gold rush was over. At its peak, Paradise had a population of over 2,000 people.

Paradise Provisional School opened about 1892 and closed in 1904. In December 1905, tenders were called to relocate the school building to Mount Shamrock.

Coringa Provisional School opened on 3 November 1930. In 1936, it become Coringa State School. It closed on 21 June 1996. It was on Coringa Road (25.3843°S 151.9775°E).

Paradise Dam was completed in 2005, inundating the town of Paradise.

== Demographics ==
In the 2016 census, Coringa had a population of 77 people.

In the 2021 census, Coringa had a population of 86 people.

== Heritage listings ==
Coringa has a number of heritage-listed sites, including:

- Campbells Road: Paradise Cemetery

== Education ==
There are no schools in Coringa. The nearest government primary schools are Dallarnil State School in neighbouring Dallarnil to the east and Biggenden State School in Biggenden to the south-east. Biggenden State School also offers secondary schooling to Year 10. The nearest government secondary schools offering secondary schooling to Year 12 are Isis District State High School in Childers to the north-east and Burnett State College in Gayndah to the south-west.
