= Mount Steadman =

- Suburb
- Interactive map of Mount Steadman
- Coordinates: 25.4566°S 151.7955°E
- Country: Australia
- State: Queensland
- LGA: North Burnett Region
- Location: 25.1 km (15.6 mi) NW of Coalstoun Lakes; 33.9 km (21.1 mi) NE of Gayndah; 37.2 km (23.1 mi) W of Biggenden; 332 km (206 mi) NNW of Brisbane

Government
  - State electorate: Callide
  - Federal division: Flynn

Area
  - Total: 39.1 km^{2} (15.1 sq mi)

Population
  - Total: 0 (2021 census)
  - Density: 0.000/km^{2} (0.00/sq mi)
- Time zone: UTC+10:00 (AEST)
- Postcode: 4650
Suburbs around Mount Steadman
Mingo	Mingo	Wateranga
Mingo	Mount Steadman	Didcot
Wetheron	Gooroolba	Didcot

Mount Steadman is a rural locality in the North Burnett Region, Queensland, Australia. In the 2021 census, Mount Steadman had "no people or a very low population".

== Geography ==
The Perry Fault, a major regional strike-slip structure in south east Queensland is in the New England Orogenic Belt. Mount Steadman is located along the Perry Fault.

The locality is roughly bounded by the Bin Bin Range to the north-east and south-east, Taylors Road to the south-west, and Gayndah Mount Perry Road to the north-west. Mount Steadman (25.4488°S 151.8167°E) rises to 354 metres (1,161 ft) above sea level is part of the range in the east of the locality.

Mount Steadman Road enters the locality from the south (Gooroolba) and exits to the north (Mingo).

The land use is grazing on native vegetation.

== History ==
The Mount Steadman Intrusion Related Gold System (IRGS) has been intermittently explored since 1888. The most recent was the Mt Steadman project covering 5,700 hectares (14,000 acres).

Mount Steadman Provisional School opened circa 1894 and closed circa 1895. Mount Steadman State School opened on 4 May 1920 and closed circa 1952.

== Demographics ==
In the 2016 census, Mount Steadman had a population of 8 people.

In the 2021 census, Mount Steadman had "no people or a very low population".

== Economy ==
There are a number of homesteads in the locality, including:

- High Park (25.4455°S 151.7792°E)
- Morven (25.4627°S 151.8018°E)
- Perry View/ Didcot (25.4261°S 151.7744°E)
- Strathmore (25.4753°S 151.7967°E)

== Education ==
There are no schools in Mount Steadman. The nearest government primary school is Coalstoun Lakes State School in Coalstoun Lakes to the south-east. The nearest government secondary schools are Biggenden State School (to Year 10) in Biggenden to the east and Burnett State College (to Year 12) in Gayndah to the south-west.
