= Deep Creek Railway Bridge =

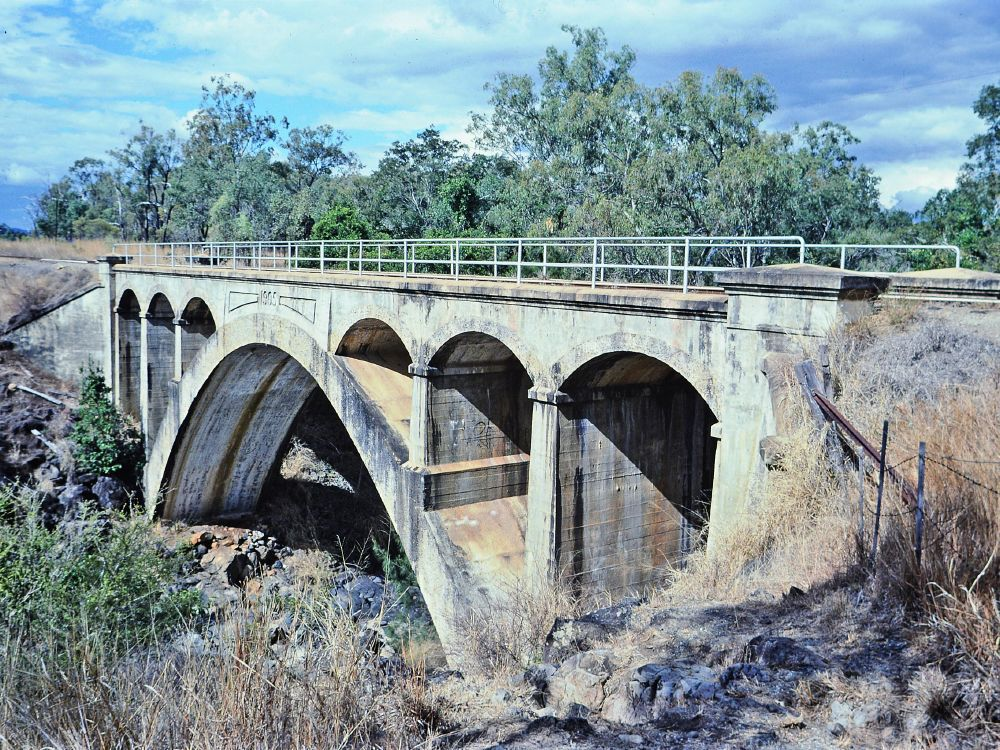
- Deep Creek Railway Bridge, 1994

- Location within Queensland Location within Australia
- 25.4666°S 151.9418°E
- Location: Mungar-Monto railway line, Didcot, North Burnett Region, Queensland, Australia

History
- Design period: 1900–1914 (early 20th century)
- Built: 1905

Site notes
- Architect: William Pagan

Queensland Heritage Register
- Official name: Deep Creek Railway Bridge, Chowey
- Type: state heritage (built)
- Designated: 21 October 1992
- Reference no.: 600031
- Significant period: 1900s (fabric)
- Significant components: abutments – railway bridge
- Builders: Day labour

Deep Creek Railway Bridge is also known as Chowey Bridge. It is a heritage-listed railway bridge on the Mungar-Monto railway line in Didcot, North Burnett Region, Queensland, Australia. It was built in 1905 by day labour. It was added to the Queensland Heritage Register on 21 October 1992.

== History ==
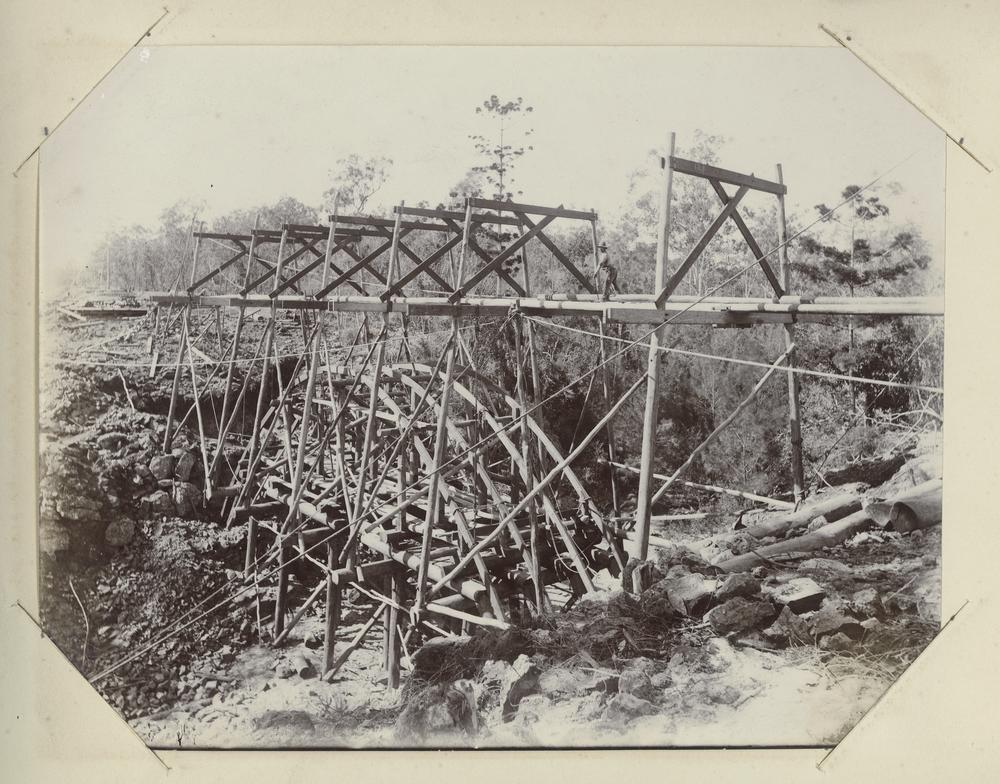
Scaffolding during construction, 1905

The Mungar-Monto railway line was built only as far as Degilbo before the financial depression of the early 1890s halted the rail construction program. Construction resumed on the Degilbo to Wetheron extension in February 1905 under the Railway Department's day labour program. The Deep Creek Railway Bridge was designed in the office of William Pagan who was Chief Engineer at the time. The Construction Department's Resident Engineer on site was Richard Ernest Sexton who later became Chief Engineer for Railways. William Pagan inspected the extent of the construction and preparatory work on the bridge in March 1905. The bridge was completed and the line opened by 21 December 1905. Pagan described the bridge in his annual report for that year as "a concrete bridge of somewhat novel design".

The bridge represented a substantial development in concrete arch bridge design. It followed the 33-foot (10 m) spans used in Swansons Rail Bridge on the Main Line near Toowoomba and the 47-foot (14 m) span at Petrie Terrace road overbridge. It was followed by two substantial concrete arch bridges on the Main Line near Lockyer.

== Description ==
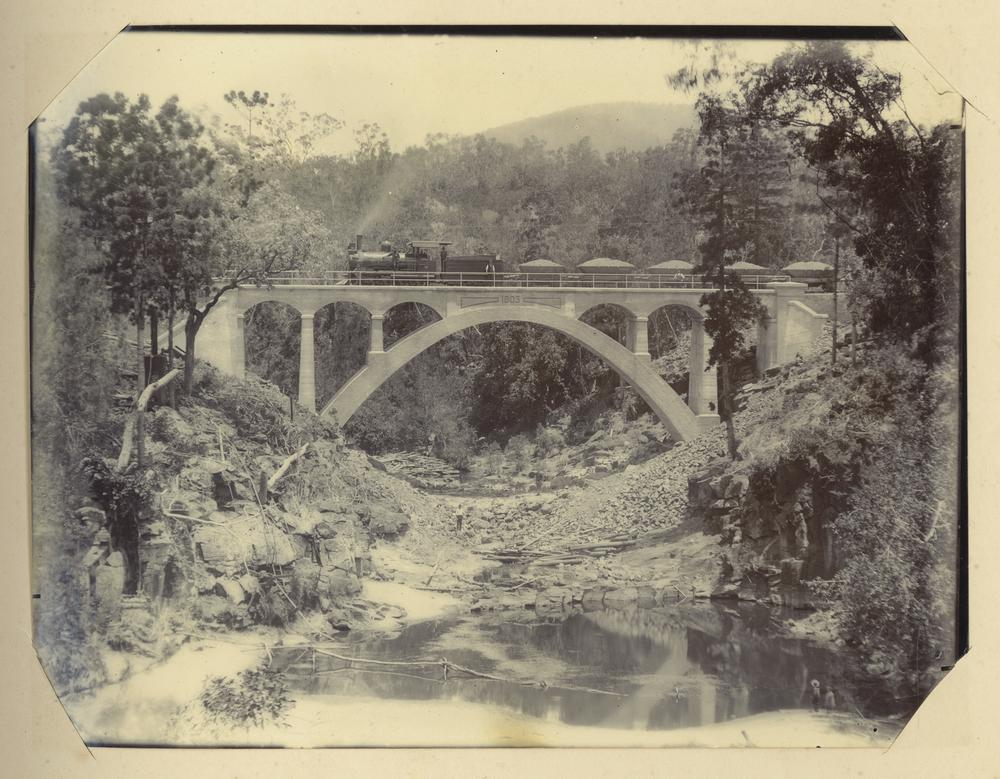
Steam train crossing the completed bridge, 1905

Deep Creek bridge is a concrete viaduct with an 80-foot (24 m) concrete arch flanked by two smaller 15-foot (4.6 m) arches, with the track run on sleepers and ballast in a trough. It has the date of construction, 1905, cast into the sides.

It consists of:

- Embankment
- 1 x 15-foot (4.6 m) concrete arch, ballasted top, concrete abutment, common concrete abutment.
- 1 x 80-foot (24 m) concrete arch with 4 x 15-foot (4.6 m)spandrel arches, ballasted top, common concrete abutments
- 1 x 15-foot (4.6 m) concrete arch, ballasted top, concrete abutments, common concrete abutment.

== Heritage listing ==
Deep Creek Railway Bridge was listed on the Queensland Heritage Register on 21 October 1992 having satisfied the following criteria.

The place is important in demonstrating the evolution or pattern of Queensland's history.

This concrete arch bridge has the third longest span of its type in Queensland and was the third bridge of its type to be constructed in Australia. The bridge frames the rocky valley of the creek and its innovative design was associated with the Chief Engineer, William Pagan.

The place demonstrates rare, uncommon or endangered aspects of Queensland's cultural heritage.

This concrete arch bridge has the third longest span of its type in Queensland and was the third bridge of its type to be constructed in Australia.

The place is important in demonstrating a high degree of creative or technical achievement at a particular period.

The bridge frames the rocky valley of the creek and its innovative design was associated with the Chief Engineer, William Pagan.

The place has a special association with the life or work of a particular person, group or organisation of importance in Queensland's history.

The bridge frames the rocky valley of the creek and its innovative design was associated with the Chief Engineer, William Pagan.

The Official Register of Engineering Heritage Markers listed

- Degilbo-Mundubbera Railway Bridges in October 2016. A total of 12 bridges that are situated on the Mungar to Mundubbera rail line, including the Chowey Bridge, are recognized with one Engineering Heritage Marker representing the “best example of a collection of historic railway bridges in Australia”.
