= Lakeside, Queensland =

Lakeside
- Suburb
- Interactive map of Lakeside
- Coordinates: 25.5566°S 152.1094°E
- Country: Australia
- State: Queensland
- LGA: North Burnett Region
- Location: 8.9 km (5.5 mi) ESE of Biggenden; 53.3 km (33.1 mi) SSW of Childers; 72.8 km (45.2 mi) ENE of Gayndah; 77.4 km (48.1 mi) W of Maryborough; 280 km (170 mi) NNW of Brisbane

Government
  - State electorate: Callide
  - Federal division: Flynn

Area
  - Total: 104.6 km^{2} (40.4 sq mi)

Population
  - Total: 69 (2021 census)
  - Density: 0.660/km^{2} (1.709/sq mi)
- Time zone: UTC+10:00 (AEST)
- Postcode: 4621
Suburbs around Lakeside
Biggenden	Woowoonga	Golden Fleece
Biggenden	Lakeside	Boompa
Biggenden	Biggenden	Boompa

Lakeside is a rural locality in the North Burnett Region, Queensland, Australia. In the 2021 census, Lakeside had a population of 69 people.

== Geography ==
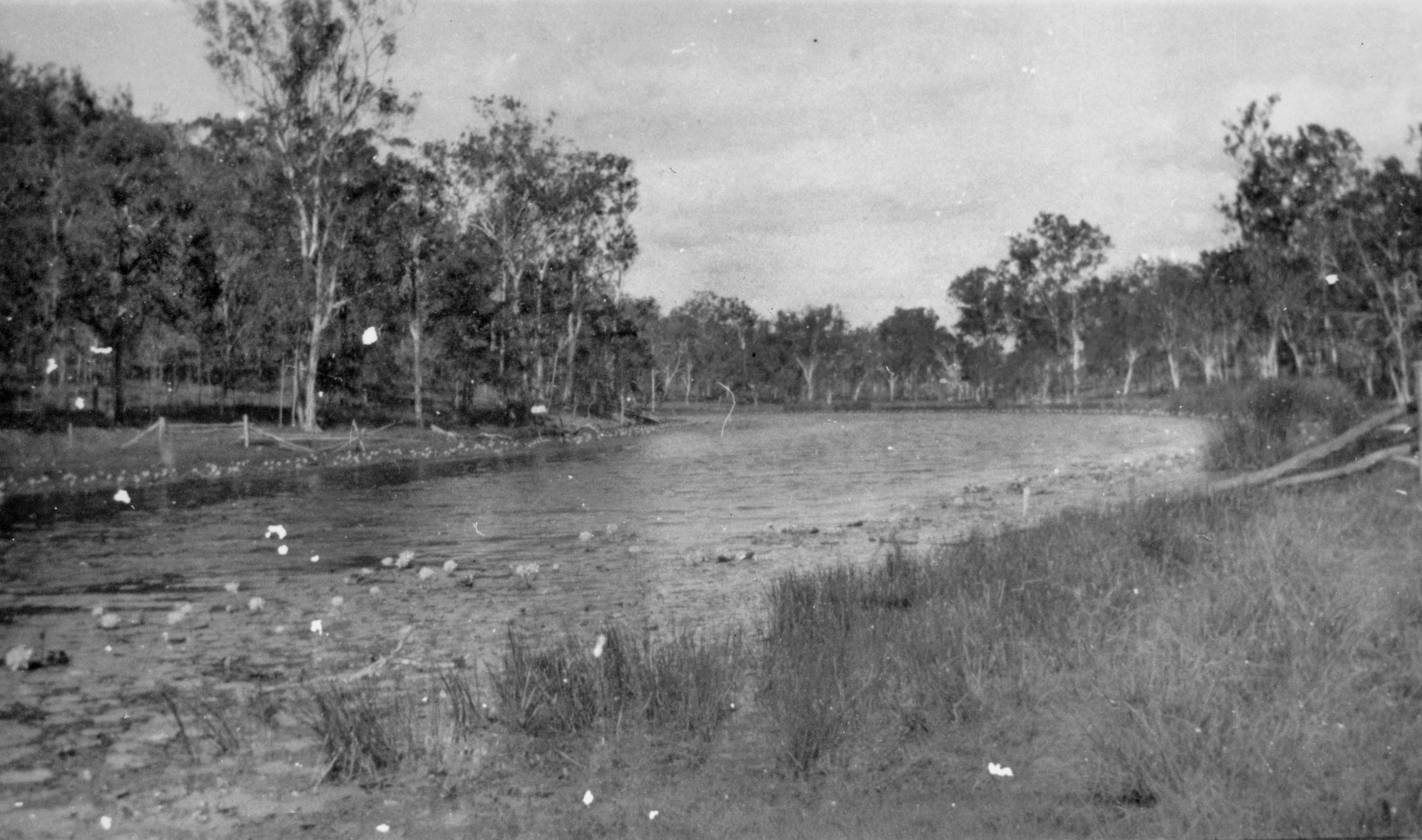
The Lake at Lakeside, 1920

The Lake is a waterhole (25.5602°S 152.1236°E).

Lakeside railway station is an abandoned railway station on the now-closed Mungar Junction to Monto railway line (25.5763°S 152.1263°E).

The land use is predominantly grazing on native vegetation.

== History ==
Mungore Creek Provisional School opened on 16 October 1893. In 1903 it was renamed Mungore Provisional School. On 1 January 1909 it became Mungore State School. In 1911 it was renamed Lakeside State School. It closed on 25 December 1948.

== Demographics ==
In the 2016 census, Lakeside had a population of 55 people.

In the 2021 census, Lakeside had a population of 69 people.

== Economy ==
There are a number of homesteads in the locality:

- Ashton (25.5426°S 152.1026°E)
- Broken Arrow Appaloosa Stud (25.5631°S 152.1530°E)
- Gayndah Monto Branch (25.5759°S 152.1281°E)
- Highstone (25.5682°S 152.0796°E)
- Hopewell (25.5412°S 152.1086°E)
- Lake Side (25.5613°S 152.1356°E)
- Magges (25.5783°S 152.1384°E)
- Nimrod Glen (25.5697°S 152.1412°E)
- Nimrod Glen (25.6123°S 152.0895°E)
- Red Hill (25.5265°S 152.1100°E)

== Education ==
There are no schools in Lakeside. The nearest government primary school and secondary school is Biggenden State School (to Year 10) in neighbouring Biggenden to the north-west. The nearest government secondary school to Year 12 is Isis District State High School in Childers to the north-east.
