= Woowoonga, Queensland =

Woowoonga
- Suburb
- Interactive map of Woowoonga
- Coordinates: 25.4566°S 152.0941°E
- Country: Australia
- State: Queensland
- LGA: North Burnett Region
- Location: 6.2 km (3.9 mi) NE of Biggenden; 45.0 km (28.0 mi) SW of Childers; 65.3 km (40.6 mi) ENE of Gayndah; 91.8 km (57.0 mi) SW of Bundaberg; 336 km (209 mi) N of Brisbane

Government
  - State electorate: Callide
  - Federal division: Flynn

Area
  - Total: 94.7 km^{2} (36.6 sq mi)

Population
  - Total: 117 (2021 census)
  - Density: 1.235/km^{2} (3.200/sq mi)
- Time zone: UTC+10:00 (AEST)
- Postcode: 4621
Suburbs around Woowoonga
| Dallarnil | Dallarnil | Golden Fleece |
| Degilbo | Woowoonga | Golden Fleece |
| Biggenden | Lakeside | Lakeside |

Woowoonga is a rural locality in the North Burnett Region, Queensland, Australia. In the 2021 census, Woowoonga had a population of 117 people.

== Geography ==
Degilbo Creek forms the south-western boundary of the locality.

The terrain is mountainous ranging from 100 to 660 metres (330 to 2,170 ft) above sea level. The Woowoonga Range passes through the western and southern parts of the locality with two named peaks, both in the north-eastern corner of the locality:

- Mount Woowoonga (25.4304°S 152.1098°E) 626 metres (2,054 ft)
- Mount Goonaneman (25.4283°S 152.1175°E) 664 metres (2,178 ft)

A number of creeks rise in the mountainous area of the locality and then flow west or north through the locality.

The Isis Highway passes through the locality near its western boundary.

Woowoonga National Park occupies the east of the locality. Apart from this protected area, the predominant land use is grazing on native vegetation.

== History ==
Woowoonga Creek Provisional School on 17 January 1898 and became Woowoonga Creek State School on 1 January 1909 only to close that same year. The school was just south of Woowoonga Creek at 25.4612°S 152.0448°E (now within the boundaries of Degilbo).

Woowoonga East State opened on 14 April 1909 and closed circa 1943. It was on the western side of Woowoonga Hall Road to the north of the hall (approx 25.4689°S 152.0731°E).

Woowoonga Methodist Church opened in 1919, following the relocation of the Methodist church building from Mount Perry. In 1939, it was relocated to Biggenden to be used as the Methodist church hall.

Woowoonga Public Hall was built in 1928.

Mount Woowoonga State School opened on 1 April 1932 and closed circa 1946.

== Demographics ==
In the 2016 census, Woowoonga had a population of 92 people.

In the 2021 census, Woowoonga had a population of 117 people.

== Education ==
There are no schools in Woowoonga. The nearest government primary schools are Biggenden State School in neighbouring Biggenden to the south-west and Dallarnil State School in neighbouring Dallarnil to the north. The nearest government secondary schools are Biggenden State School (to Year 10) in Biggenden (to Year 10) and Isis District State High School (to Year 12) in Childers to the north-east.

== Amenities ==
Woowoonga Public Hall is on the western side of Woowoonga Hall Road (25.4704°S 152.0730°E).

== Events ==
Mother's Day and Father's Day are celebrated with a bush breakfast at the Woowonga Public Hall every year.
