= Dallarnil =

- Town
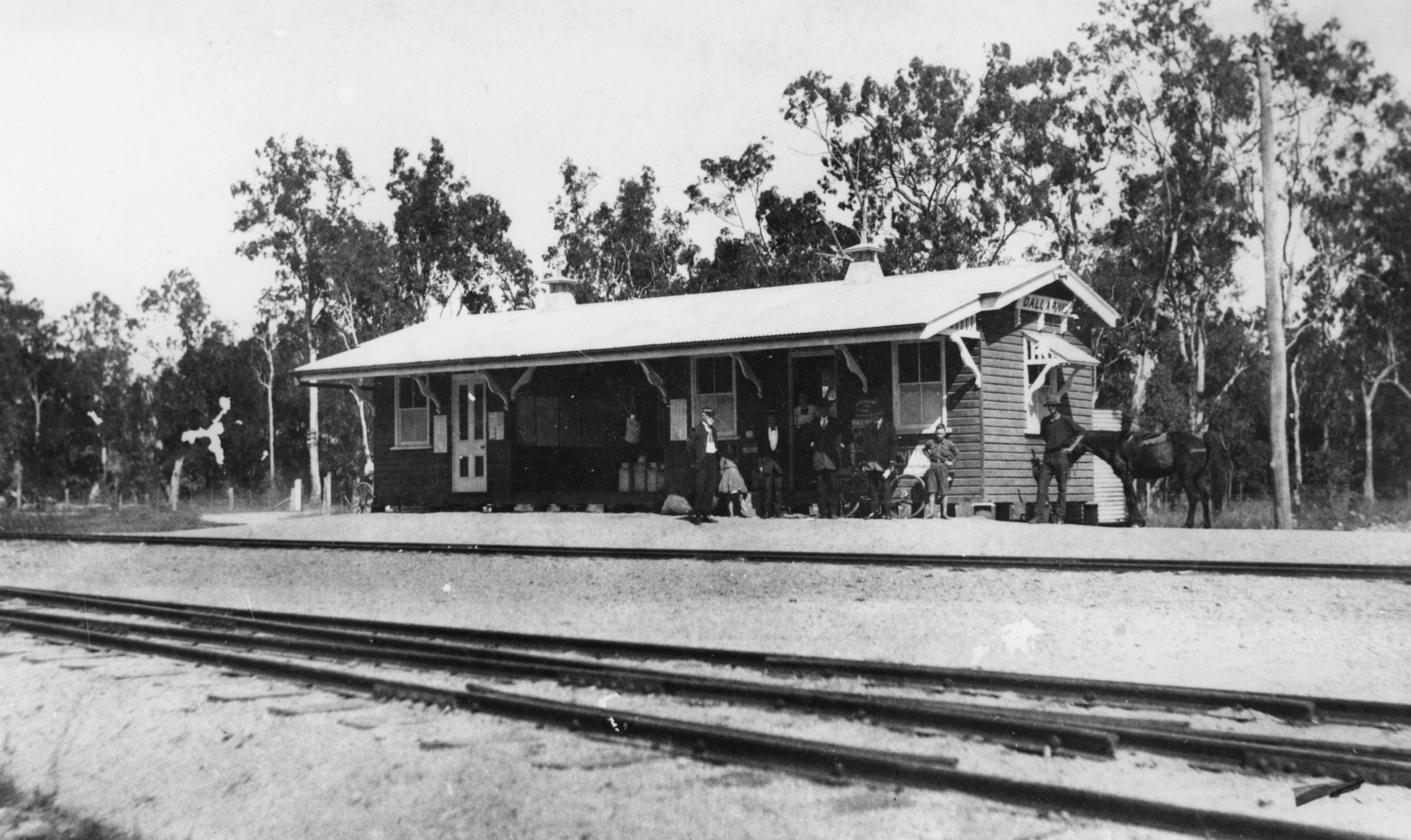
- Dallarnil railway station

- Interactive map of Dallarnil
- Coordinates: 25.3866°S 152.0466°E
- Country: Australia
- State: Queensland
- LGA: North Burnett Region
- Location: 31.5 km (19.6 mi) SW of Childers; 68.9 km (42.8 mi) NE of Gayndah; 78.3 km (48.7 mi) SW of Bundaberg; 89.9 km (55.9 mi) W of Hervey Bay; 352 km (219 mi) NNW of Brisbane

Government
  - State electorate: Callide
  - Federal division: Flynn

Area
  - Total: 148.6 km^{2} (57.4 sq mi)

Population
  - Total: 245 (2021 census)
  - Density: 1.649/km^{2} (4.270/sq mi)
- Time zone: UTC+10:00 (AEST)
- Postcode: 4621
Localities around Dallarnil
Good Night	Booyal	Booyal
Coringa	Dallarnil	Golden Fleece
Degilbo	Woowoonga	Golden Fleece

Dallarnil is a rural town and locality in the North Burnett Region, Queensland, Australia. In the 2021 census, the locality of Dallarnil had a population of 245 people.

The neighbourhood of Stanton is within the locality (25.333°S 152.0500°E).

== History ==
In 1887, 42,240 acres (17,090 ha) of land were resumed from the Stanton Harcourt pastoral run. The land was offered for selection for the establishment of small farms on 17 April 1887.

Dallarnil Provisional School opened on 26 February 1901. On 1 January 1909, it became Dallarnil State School.

In November 1901, the first Anglican services were held in the provisional school.

Dallarnil North Provisional School opened in June 1904. On 1 January 1909, it became Dallarnil North State School It closed in 1937. It was on the northern side of Grills Lane (approx 25.34200°S 152.00474°E).

The town takes its name from the former Dallarnil railway station (25.3875°S 152.0474°E) on the Isis railway line, named by the Queensland Railways Department on 2 September 1911. The railway station name was derived from the name of a pastoral run name, and is a corruption of an Aboriginal word, "conalaman" meaning big hill.

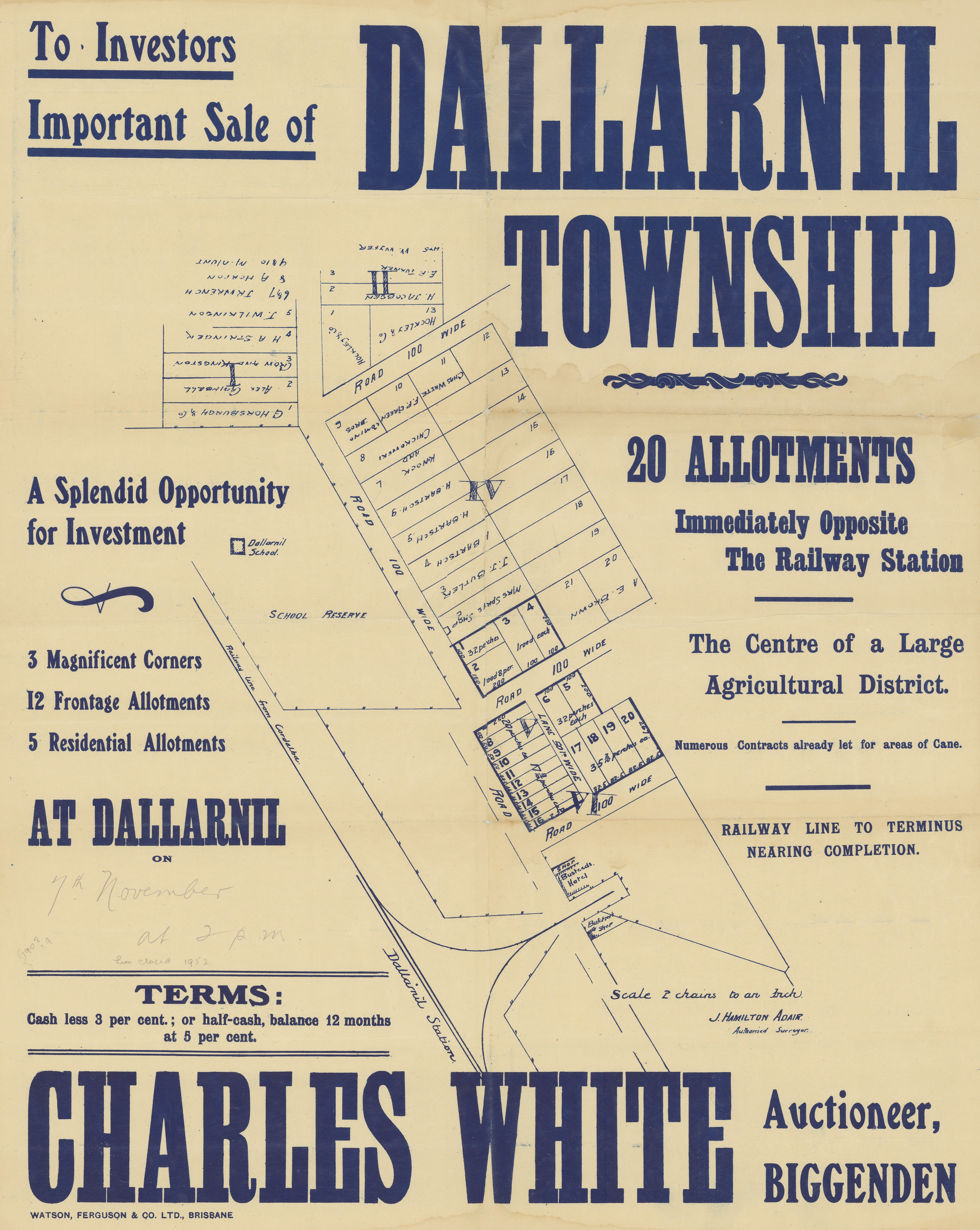
Real estate advertisement, 1914

In October 1912, 20 allotments of the Dallarnil Township were advertised to be auctioned by Charles White of Biggenden. A map advertising the auction states the allotments were immediately opposite the railway station with the railway line to terminus nearing completion.

The neighbourhood of Stanton takes its name from the former Stanton railway station (25.3291°S 152.045°E) on the Isis railway line, which was named by the Queensland Railways Department on 16 July 1914, which in turn takes its name from the pastoral run Stanton Harcourt named in 1854.

It is unclear when Dallarnil Gospel Hall opened, but Gospel Hall Road (presumably named after it) is in existence by 1915.

On Sunday 27 November 1921, Archbishop Gerald Sharp dedicated the new Anglican Church to St James, the Apostle and Martyr.

St Francis Xavier's Catholic Church was officially opened on Sunday 1 October 1933 by Archbishop James Duhig. It was 48 by 30 feet (14.6 by 9.1 m) and built from timber at a cost of £270. In 1958, the church building was relocated to Tiaro.

A stump-capping ceremony for a Methodist church was held Saturday 12 October 1946. Unable to afford the cost of a contractor, the church was built with volunteer labour under the supervision of a carpenter. The church was officially opened on Saturday 16 July 1947. The timber church was designed by Cook and Kerrison. In 1977, following the amalgamation of the Methodist Church into the Uniting Church in Australia, it became Dallarnil Uniting Church. The church was closed and subsequently sold on 18 March 2021. It was at 4 Main Street (25.38135°S 152.045°E).

The railway line from Childers to Dallarnil closed on 30 June 1955.

== Demographics ==
In the 2016 census, the locality of Dallarnil had a population of 230 people.

In the 2021 census, the locality of Dallarnil had a population of 245 people.

== Education ==
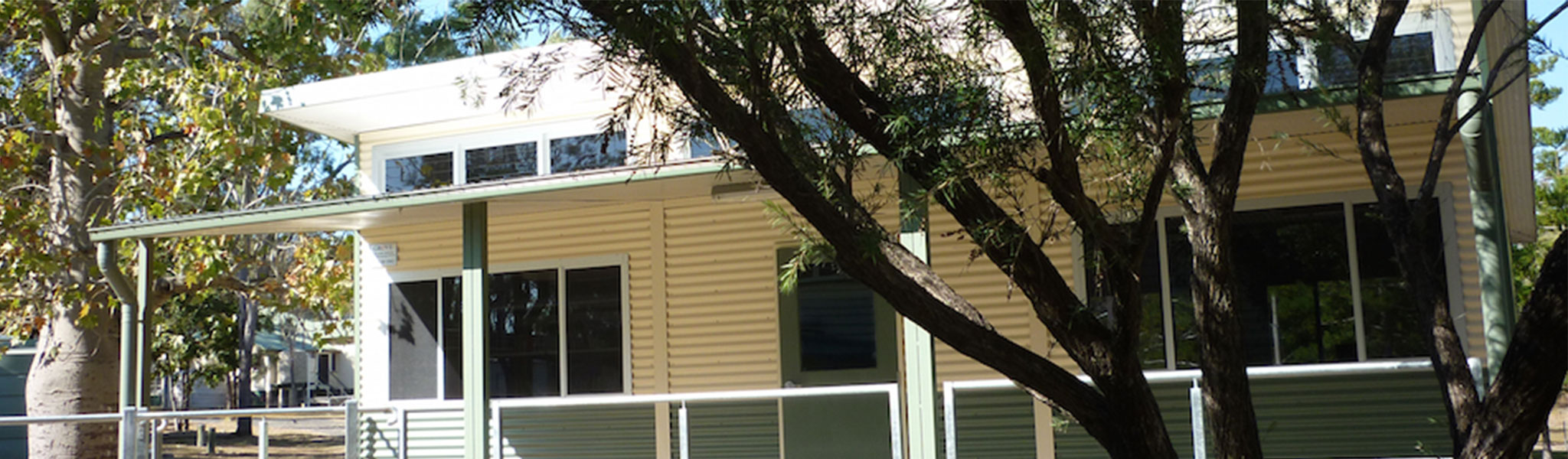
Dallarnil State School, 2024

Dallarnil State School is a government primary (Prep-6) school for boys and girls at 3 Main Street (25.3839°S 152.0456°E). In 2017, the school had an enrolment of 25 students with 5 teachers (2 full-time equivalent) and 4 non-teaching staff (2 full-time equivalent).

There are no secondary schools in Dallarnil. The nearest government secondary schools are Biggenden State School (to Year 10) in Biggenden to the south and Isis District State High School (to Year 12) in Childers to the north-east.

== Heritage listings ==
Dallarnil has a number of heritage-listed sites, including:

- Dallarnil Cemetery, Isis Highway
- Dallarnil Hall and Sports Grounds, Isis Highway

== Amenities ==
Dallarnil Gospel Hall is in Gospel Hall Road (25.407497°S 152.05°E). It is affiliated with the Christian Community Churches of Australia.

The Sportsground is a designated bus stop of the North Burnett Transport Service. The timetable connects with the Tilt Train on Tuesday and Thursday mornings in Bundaberg, and Friday morning in Maryborough.

The nearest post office is at Biggenden.
