= Degilbo =

- Town
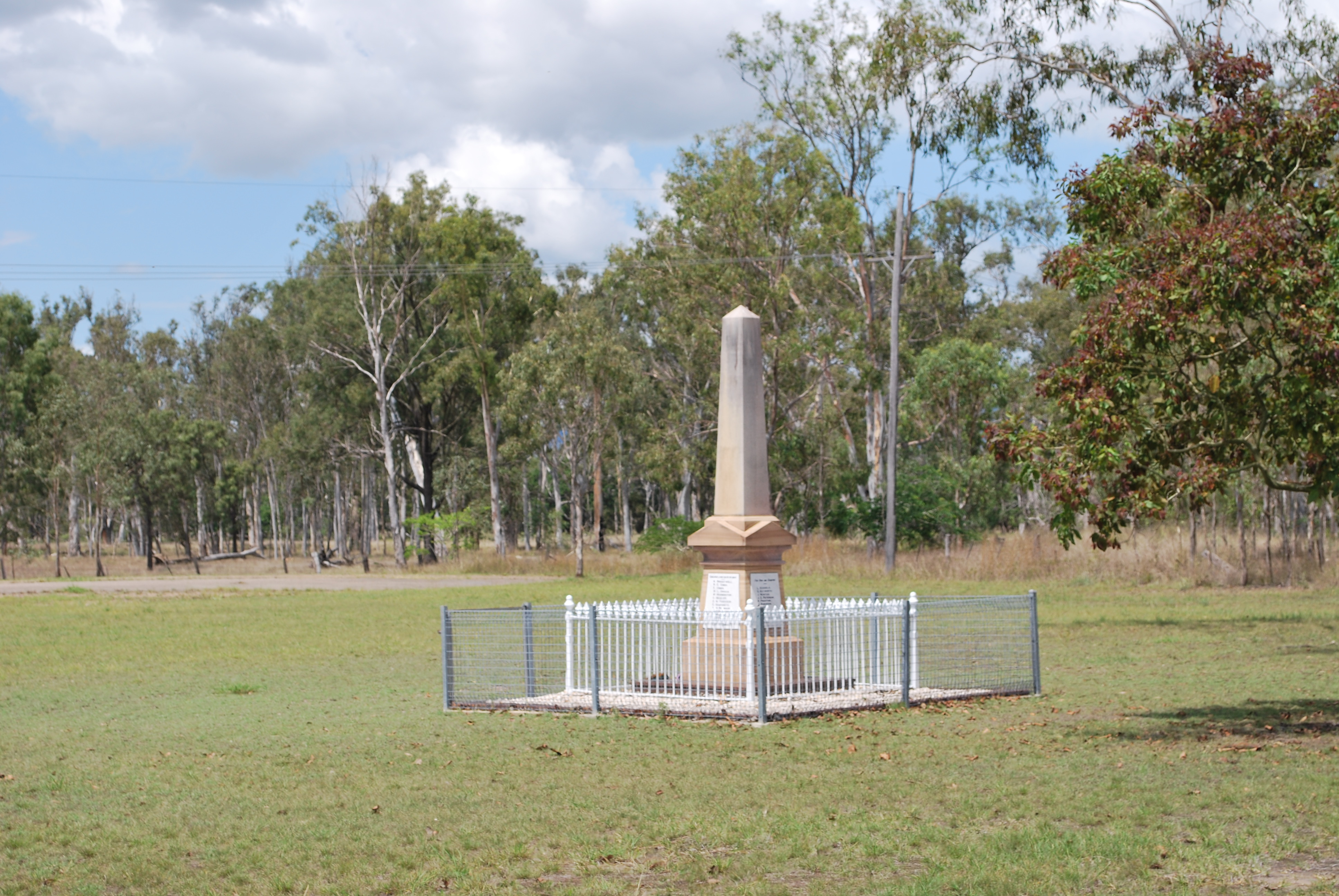
- War memorial

- Interactive map of Degilbo
- Coordinates: 25.4827°S 151.9994°E
- Country: Australia
- State: Queensland
- LGA: North Burnett Region
- Location: 48.5 km (30.1 mi) SW of Childers; 51.9 km (32.2 mi) NE of Gayndah; 93.1 km (57.8 mi) W of Maryborough; 290 km (180 mi) NNW of Brisbane

Government
  - State electorate: Callide
  - Federal division: Flynn

Area
  - Total: 93.8 km^{2} (36.2 sq mi)

Population
  - Total: 182 (2021 census)
  - Density: 1.940/km^{2} (5.025/sq mi)
- Time zone: UTC+10:00 (AEST)
- Postcode: 4621
Localities around Degilbo
Didcot	Coringa	Dallarnil
Didcot	Degilbo	Woowoonga
Biggenden	Biggenden	Biggenden

Degilbo is a rural town and locality in the North Burnett Region, Queensland, Australia. In the 2021 census, the locality of Degilbo had a population of 182 people.

== History ==
The name Degilbo was the name of a pastoral run owned by William Henry Walsh (a Member of the Queensland Legislative Council) in 1847. It is believed to be an Aboriginal word dackeel bo meaning sharp or upright stones. A very popular story is that Degilbo is actually the word obliged spelt backwards, attributed to a railway surveyor, who had to assign names to many railway stations, had run out of ideas but as he was obliged to come up with a name, he wrote that word down backwards. Being perhaps a more entertaining story, the story of the backwards spelling is frequently published, and is usually followed by a spate of correspondence pointing out that the name of the pastoral run preceded the railway station by at least 20 years.

The first Degilbo Post Office opened on 1 April 1893. It was renamed Woowoonga in 1894, Appallan in 1897 and Degilbo in 1898. It closed in 1958.

Woowoonga Provisional School opened on 15 March 1894. In 1898 it was renamed Degilbo Provisional School and in January 1908 it became Degilbo State School. With only 11 students enrolled as at November 2007, the school was mothballed on 31 December 2007 before final closure on 5 June 2008. It was at 598 Gooroolba Road (25.4829°S 151.9971°E). The school's website was archived.

Woowoonga Creek Provisional School on 17 January 1898 and became Woowoonga Creek State School on 1 January 1909 only to close that same year. The school was just south of Woowoonga Creek (25.4612°S 152.0448°E).

Mount Appallan Provisional School opened on 4 August 1902. On 1 January 1909, it became Mount Appallan State School. It closed in 1953. It was at 33 Cheese Factory Road (25.4376°S 152.0024°E). It was named after Mount Appallan (25.4179°S 152.0034°E).

The Degilbo War Memorial was unveiled on Sunday 17 September 1922. It commemorates those who served and died in World War I. It is located beside the Isis Highway (25.48502°S 152.00108°E).

The Bicentennial National Trail passes Degilbo.

== Demographics ==
In the 2011 census, the locality of Degilbo had a population of 338 people.

In the 2016 census, the locality of Degilbo had a population of 174 people.

In the 2021 census, the locality of Degilbo had a population of 182 people.

== Heritage listings ==
Degilbo has a number of heritage-listed sites, including:

- 6 kilometres (3.7 mi) west of Degilbo on the Mungar-Monto railway line: Deep Creek Railway Bridge, Chowey
- Exhibition Street: Degilbo Hall
- 607 Seccombes Road, off Maryborough - Biggenden Road: Degilbo Cemetery

The Official Register of Engineering Heritage Markers listed

- Degilbo-Mundubbera Railway Bridges in October 2016. A total of 12 bridges that are situated on the Mungar to Mundubbera rail line, including the Chowey Bridge, are recognized with one Engineering Heritage Marker representing the "best example of a collection of historic railway bridges in Australia".

== Education ==
There are no schools in Degilbo. The nearest government primary schools are Biggenden State School in neighbouring Biggenden to the south-east, Dallarnil State School in neighbouring Dallarnil to the north-east, and Coalstoun Lakes State School in Coalstoun Lakes to the south-west.The nearest government secondary schools are Biggenden State School in Biggenden (to Year 10), Burnett State College (to Year 12) in Gayndah to the south-west, and Childers State High School (to Year 12) in Childers to the north-east.
