= Didcot, Queensland =

Didcot
- Suburb
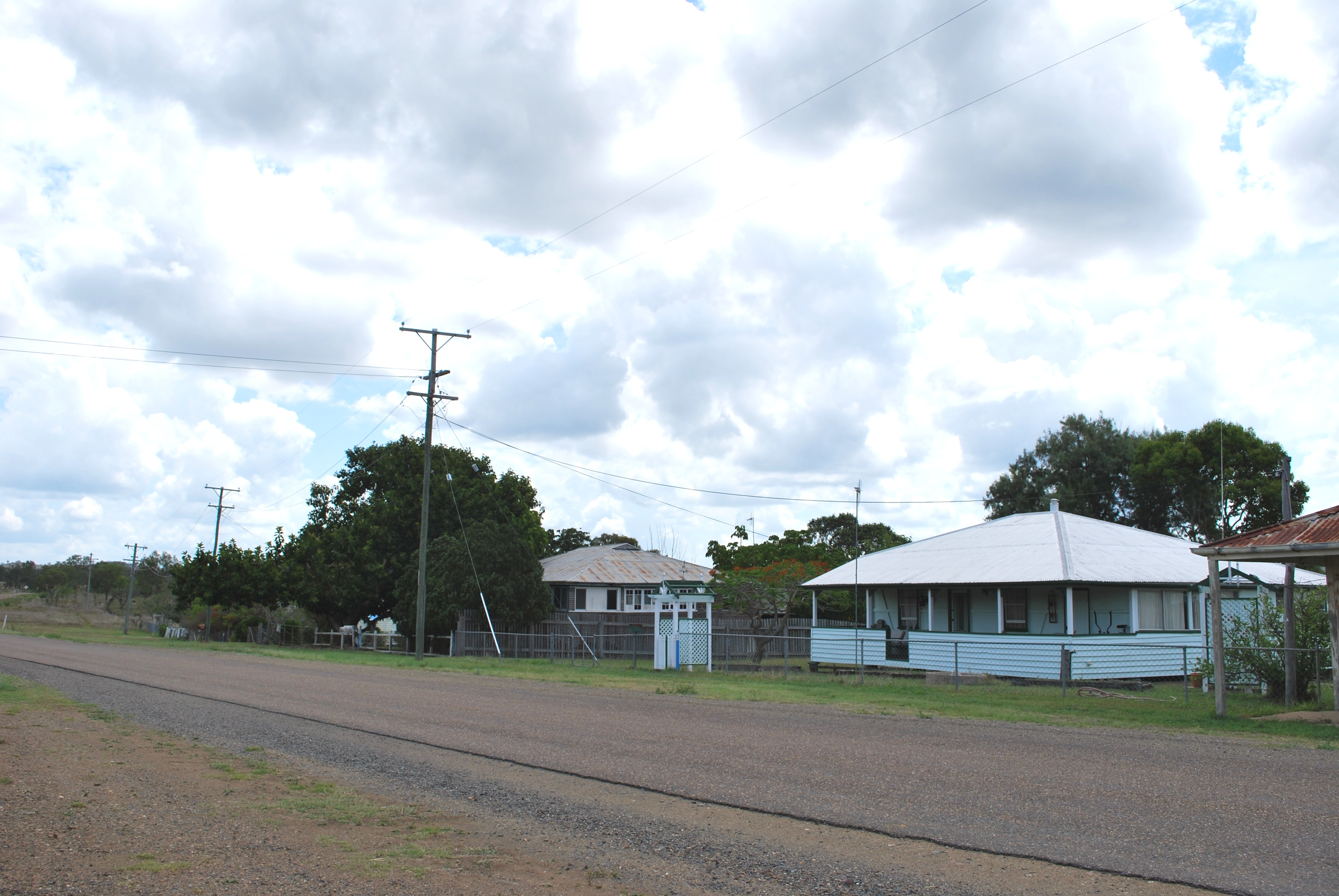
- Didcot, 2008

- Interactive map of Didcot
- Coordinates: 25.4677°S 151.8636°E
- Country: Australia
- State: Queensland
- LGA: North Burnett Region
- Location: 30.8 km (19.1 mi) NE of Gayndah; 112 km (70 mi) W of Maryborough; 312 km (194 mi) NNW of Brisbane

Government
  - State electorate: Callide
  - Federal division: Flynn

Area
  - Total: 126.0 km^{2} (48.6 sq mi)

Population
  - Total: 85 (2021 census)
  - Density: 0.675/km^{2} (1.747/sq mi)
- Time zone: UTC+10:00 (AEST)
- Postcode: 4621
Suburbs around Didcot
Wateranga	Wateranga	Coringa
Mount Steadman	Didcot	Degilbo
Wilson Valley; Gooroolba	Coalstoun Lakes	Biggenden

Didcot is a rural locality in the North Burnett Region, Queensland, Australia. In the 2021 census, Didcot had a population of 85 people.

== Geography ==
Gooroolba Biggenden Road enters the locality from the south-west (Gooroolba), passes through the town (where it is called Merritt Street) and exits to the north-east (Coringa / Degilbo).

The now-closed Mungar-Monto railway line passed through Didcot from west to east with two now-abandoned railway stations serving the locality:

- Didcot railway station, serving the town (25.4745°S 151.8682°E)
- Chowey railway station in the east of the locality (25.4648°S 151.9372°E).

Didcot has two mountains in the north-east of the locality:

- Mount Shamrock (25.4335°S 151.9254°E) 135 metres (443 ft)
- Mount Melville (25.4359°S 151.9318°E) 160 metres (520 ft)

Mount Shamrock is a former mining town in the north-east of the locality (25.4381°S 151.9252°E), immediately south of the mountain of the same name.

Degilbo Timber Reserve 1 is in the east of the locality and Degilbo Timber Reserve 2 is in the south-east of the locality. Apart from these protected areas, the land use is predominantly grazing on native vegetation.

== History ==
A report by R. W. Winks of the Department of Agriculture, Brisbane, surveying for the proposed Degilbo to Gayndah railway line extension, dated 10 November 1897 stated:- "After arranging for a horse, I proceeded to what is known as Irwin's Hotel, an accommodation-house on Didcot Creek, about 9 miles (14 km) from Woowoonga." Degilbo at that time was known as Woowoonga.

Mount Shamrock was declared a goldfield in July 1886.

Mount Shamrock Provisional School opened on 24 February 1890. In August 1890, 10 acres (4.0 ha) were reserved for school purposes on Mount Shamrock Road (25.4393°S 151.9231°E). The school closed in October 1893 due to low student numbers. It reopened on 7 April 1896 as Mount Shamrock Provisional School. On 1 January 1909, it became Mount Shamrock State School. It closed in July 1935.

Didcot Provisional School opened on 23 November 1908. On 1 January 1909, it became Didcot State School. It closed in 1967. The school was on a 10-acre (4.0 ha) site on the south-western corner of Merritt Street and Hamilton Street (25.4766°S 151.8645°E).

Town and suburban land parcels in Didcot were offered for sale in March 1910.

== Demographics ==
In the 2011 census, Didcot and nearby districts had a population of 287 people.

In the 2016 census, Didcot had a population of 60 people.

In the 2021 census, Didcot had a population of 85 people.

== Heritage listings ==
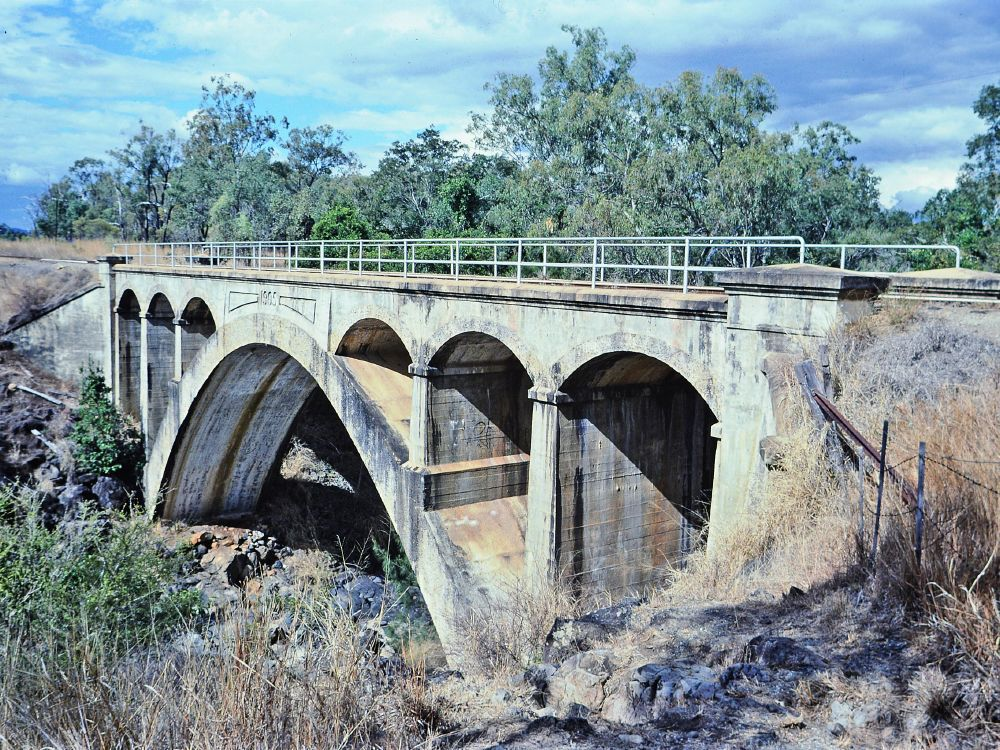
Deep Creek (Chowey) Bridge (1994)

Didcot has a number of heritage-listed sites, including:

- Chowey Cemetery (also known as Mount Shamrock Cemetery), Chowey Cemetery Road, off Gooroolba Biggenden Road
- Deep Creek Railway Bridge, on the Mungar-Monto railway line

Engineers Australia listed on their Official Register of Engineering Heritage Markers:

- Degilbo-Mundubbera Railway Bridges in October 2016. A total of 12 bridges that are situated on the Mungar Junction to Monto railway line, including the Deep Creek Railway Bridge, are recognized with one Engineering Heritage Marker representing the "best example of a collection of historic railway bridges in Australia".

== Economy ==
There are a number of homesteads in the locality:

- Avalon (25.4687°S 151.8334°E)
- Bibaringa (25.5004°S 151.8552°E)
- Brahman Pk (25.5687°S 151.8935°E)
- Danebo (25.5043°S 151.8739°E)
- Nora Creina (25.4624°S 151.8795°E)
- Plum Tree (25.4645°S 151.8919°E)
- Warra Creek (25.4993°S 151.8519°E)

== Education ==
There are no schools in Didcot. The nearest government primary schools are Coalstoun Lakes State School in neighbouring Coalstoun Lakes to the south and Biggenden State School in neighbouring Biggenden to the south-east. The nearest government secondary schools are Biggenden State School (to Year 10) and Burnett State College (to Year 12) in Gayndah to the south-west.
