= Auburn River Dam =

- Location of the proposed dam in Queensland
- Country: Australia
- Location: Mundubbera, Wide Bay-Burnett
- Coordinates: 25°43′42″S 151°06′47″E
- Purpose: Multi-purpose
- Status: Proposed

Dam and spillways
- Impounds: Auburn River
- Height: 30–40 m (98–131 ft)
- Length: 490 m (1,610 ft)

Reservoir
- Normal elevation: 135 m (443 ft)

The Auburn River Dam is a proposed dam across the Auburn River, located near Mundubbera, in the Wide Bay-Burnett region of Queensland, Australia.

The site was recommended for a new dam site after an earlier soil test declared the area's topography and clay based soil ideal for a large dammed reservoir.

At present, no conclusive plans have been created and the dam has not been proposed by either the Queensland Government or SunWater.

== See also ==
- List of dams and reservoirs in Australia
- Auburn River National Park
