= Burnett River =

Burnett
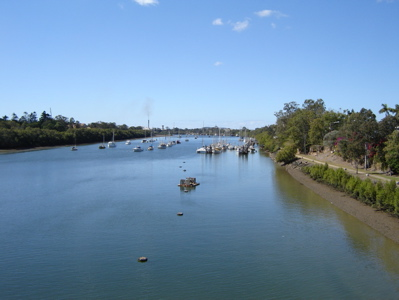
- The Burnett River with the city of Bundaberg on either side

- Location of Burnett River mouth in Queensland
- Etymology: James Charles Burnett

Location
- Country: Australia
- State: Queensland
- Regions: Central Queensland, Wide Bay–Burnett
- Cities: Mundubbera, Gayndah, Wallaville, Bundaberg, Burnett Heads

Physical characteristics
- Source: Mount Gaeta, Great Dividing Range
  - location: near Monto
  - coordinates: 24°51′S 151°36′E
- Mouth: Coral Sea
  - location: Burnett Heads
  - coordinates: 24°45′16″S 152°23′48″E
  - elevation: 0 m (0 ft)
- Length: 435 km (270 mi)
- Basin size: 32,220 km^{2} (12,440 sq mi)
- Discharge
  - location: Near mouth
  - average: 2,460,984 ML/a (77.9839 m^{3}/s)

Basin features
- Tributaries
  - right: Three Moon Creek, Nogo River, Auburn River, Boyne River, Barambah Creek
- Reservoir: Paradise Dam

The Burnett River is a river in the Wide Bay–Burnett and Central Queensland regions of Queensland, Australia.

== Course and features ==
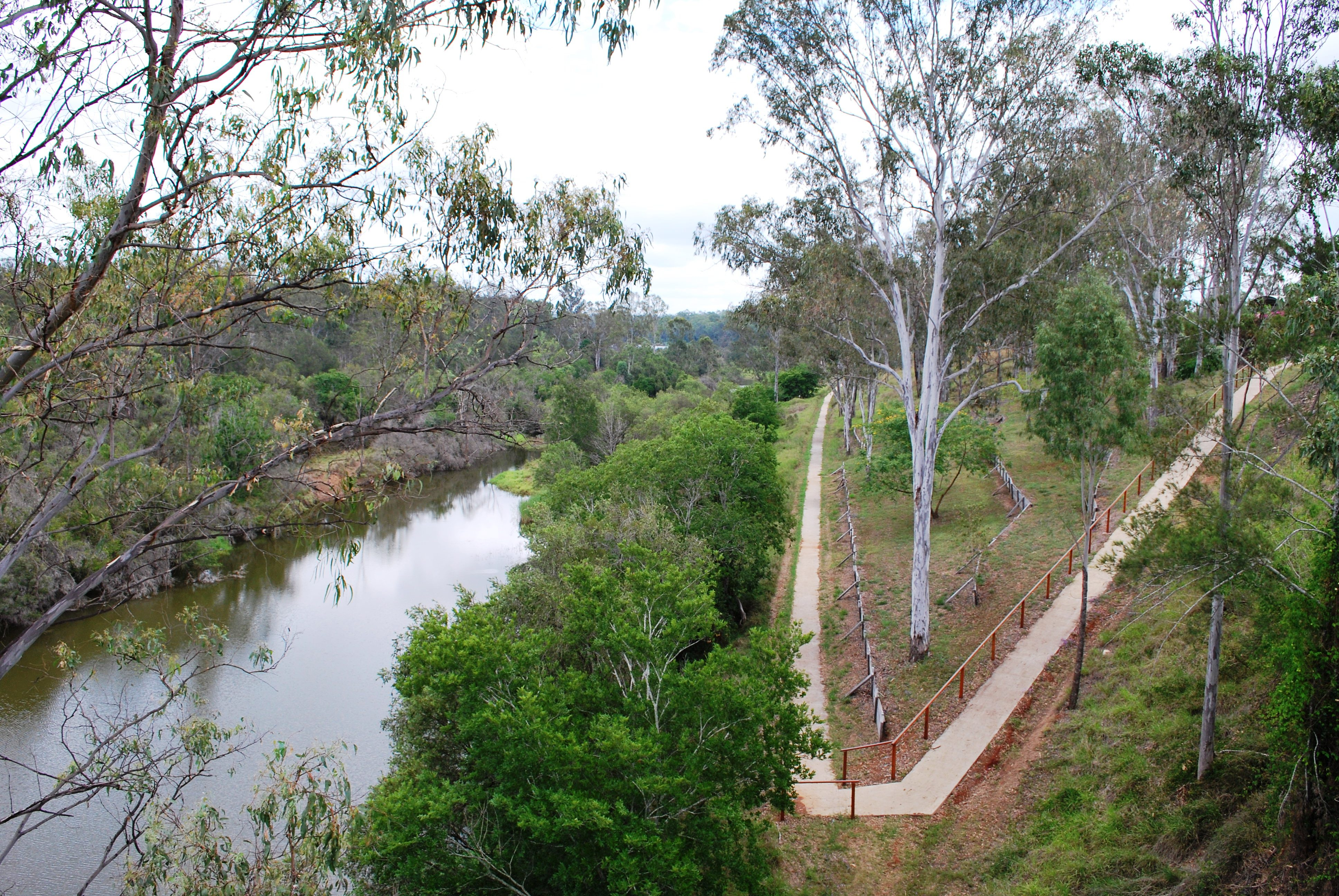
The Burnett River at Mundubbera

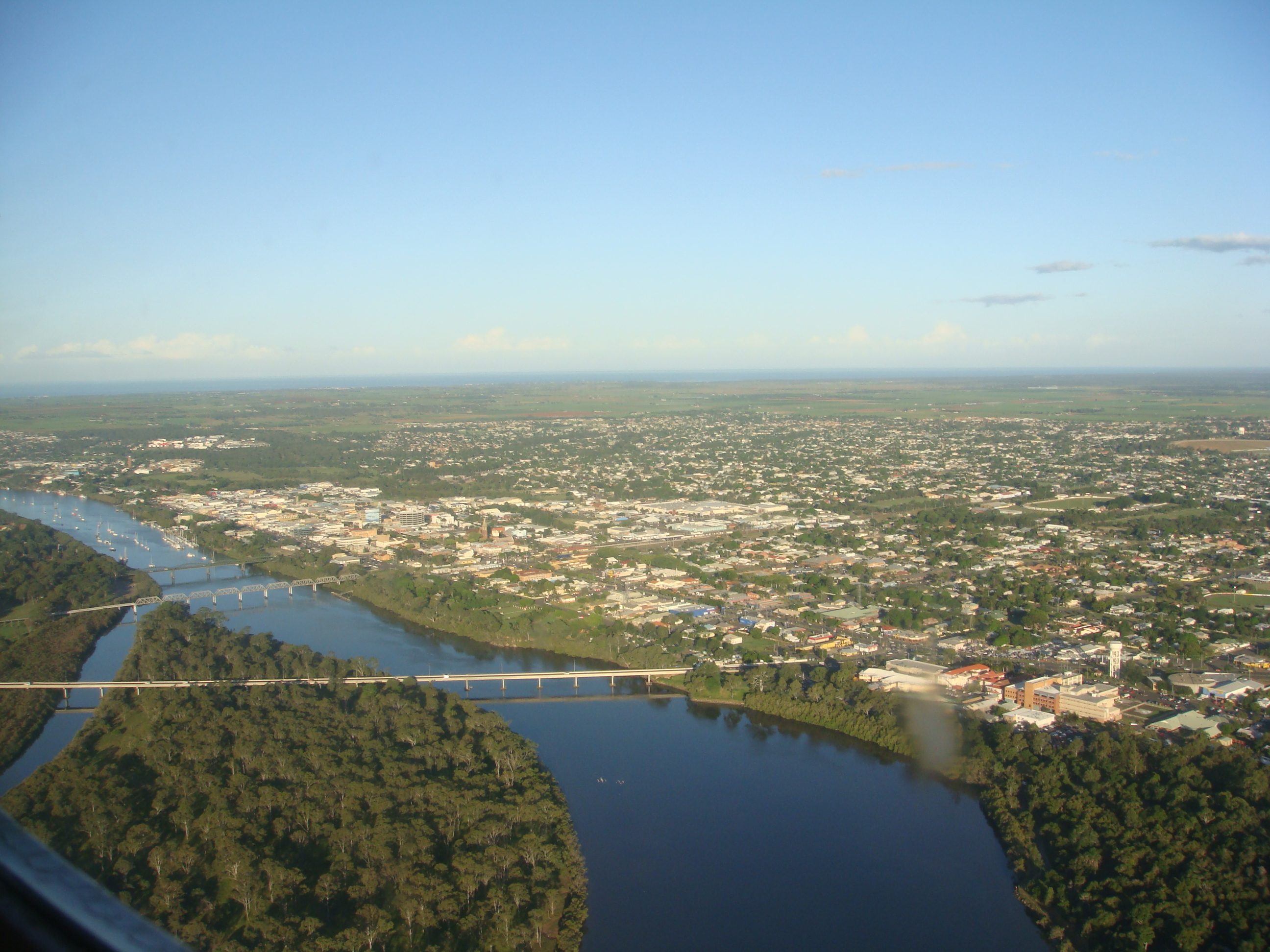
Bridges across the river in Bundaberg

The Burnett River rises in the Burnett Range, part of the Great Dividing Range, close to Mount Gaeta and east of Monto. It drains a basin covering 33,210 km² which is 1.9% of the total area of Queensland.

The river flows generally south past Eidsvold and Mundubbera before heading east, adjacent to the townships of Gayndah and Wallaville before entering the city of Bundaberg. The river flows into the Coral Sea at Burnett Heads, roughly 20 kilometres (12 mi) from Bundaberg. The river descends 485 metres (1,591 ft) over its 435-kilometre (270 mi) course.

The Burnett River region is largely given over to growing sugar cane and small crops. The river is part of the Brigalow Belt and South East Queensland bioregions.

=== Major tributaries ===
==== Three Moon Creek ====
Three Moon Creek rises near Kroombit Tops National Park north of Monto and flows south through Monto and Mulgildie, it is dammed near Cania Gorge to form Lake Cania, before emptying into the Burnett River south-east of Abercorn.

==== Nogo River ====
The Nogo River rises in the hills north-west of Monto, is dammed west of Abercorn to form Wuruma Lake, and flows south-east to join the Burnett near Ceratodus.

==== Auburn River ====
The Auburn River rises in the hills about 20 kilometres (12 mi) west of Cracow, flows south before swinging to the north-east at its confluence with Johnson Creek, passing through the Auburn River National Park, a little-known and untouched piece of pristine bush including Auburn Waterfall, and flows into the Burnett River west of Mundubbera.

==== Boyne River ====
The Boyne River rises in the Bunya Mountains National Park south-west of Kingaroy and flows in a general northerly direction, it is dammed near Proston to form Lake Boondooma, emptying into the Burnett River near Mundubbera, only 5 kilometres (3.1 mi) from the Burnett River-Auburn River confluence.

==== Barambah Creek ====
Barambah Creek rises in the hills between Kingaroy and the Sunshine Coast, north of Jimna and flows in a generally northerly direction, it flows just below the dam wall of Lake Barambah, also known as Bjelke-Petersen Dam, before meeting the Burnett River north-east of Gayndah near Ban Ban Springs.

== History ==
=== Prehistory ===
The Burnett River area was historically inhabited by the Taribelang Aboriginal tribe.

=== European exploration ===
The river is named after James Charles Burnett, the first European explorer to visit the river in 1847.

=== Dam construction ===
Construction of the Paradise Dam on the Burnett River, 80 kilometres (50 mi) upstream from Bundaberg, was completed in November 2005. The dam reservoir has a capacity of 300,000 megalitres (6.6×10^{10} imp gal; 7.9×10^{10} US gal). Named after the old gold mining township of Paradise, which is now submerged under the waters of the reservoir, all of the structures and artefacts found at the site were transferred to the nearby town of Biggenden. The design of the dam complies with environmental guidelines and includes a fish ladder that allows fish such as the Queensland lungfish to travel upstream as well as downstream from the dam wall.

Paradise Dam was damaged in 2013 floods, and currently operates at reduced capacity. In early 2024, the Queensland Government announced it would be replaced by a new Paradise Dam rather than attempting further repairs.

== Fish ==
The Burnett River, together with the nearby Mary River, is home to the Queensland lungfish, one of the most ancient of the extant vertebrate species. The longest-lived known individual known for the Queensland lungfish, a male nicknamed "Granddad", was born and captured in the Burnett River before being transported to the Shedd Aquarium in Chicago, Illinois in 1933, where he lived to the estimated age of 109 years old before he died of natural causes in 2017.

== See also ==
- List of rivers of Australia § Queensland
- Auburn River Dam
- Bundaberg
