= Paradise Dam (Queensland) =

Dam in Wide Bay-Burnett region, Queensland, Australia

- Location of the dam wall in Queensland
- Country: Australia
- Location: near Biggenden, Wide Bay-Burnett, Queensland
- Coordinates: 25°21′01″S 151°55′07″E
- Purpose: Irrigation
- Status: Operational
- Construction began: 2003
- Opening date: 2005
- Construction cost: A$240 million
- Owner: Burnett Water
- Operator: SunWater

Dam and spillways
- Type of dam: Gravity dam
- Impounds: Burnett River
- Height: 37 m (121 ft)
- Length: 940 m (3,080 ft)
- Dam volume: 400×10^{3} m^{3} (14×10^{6} cu ft)
- Spillways: 1
- Spillway type: Stepped spillway chute with a smooth ogee
- Spillway capacity: 33,000 m^{3}/s (1,200,000 cu ft/s)

Reservoir
- Creates: Lake Paradise
- Total capacity: 300,000 ML (240,000 acre⋅ft)
- Surface area: 3,300 ha (8,200 acres)
- Maximum water depth: 38.2 m (125 ft)
- Normal elevation: 67.6 m (222 ft) AHD

Paradise Dam Mini Hydro
- Coordinates: 25°21′04″S 151°55′10″E
- Operator: SunWater
- Commission date: 2006
- Type: Conventional
- Turbines: 1 X 2.7 MW (3,600 hp) Kaplan

The Paradise Dam, also known as the Burnett River Dam, is a gravity dam across the Burnett River, located between Coringa and Good Night northwest of Biggenden and 80 kilometres (50 mi) southwest of Bundaberg in the Wide Bay-Burnett region of Queensland, Australia. Built for irrigation, the impoundment created by the dam is called Lake Paradise.

In September 2019, concerns about the structural stability of the dam resulted in the water levels in the dam being lowered to 42% of its maximum capacity. In 2020 a report found that the roller compacted concrete was "intrinsically incapable" of achieving the required standard for safety. In 2024, it was announced that the dam would be functionally replaced with an entirely new dam due to these concerns.

== Location and features ==
The concrete dam wall is up to 37.1 metres (122 ft) high and spans approximately 600 metres (2,000 ft). The dam is named for the ghost town of Paradise, flooded following construction.

Approval to build the dam was given in 2002. It was constructed on behalf of the Queensland Government between 2003 and 2005. The dam is owned by a government-owned corporation, Burnett Water. Since construction was completed in December 2005, it has been operated by another Queensland government-owned corporation, SunWater. Construction of the 300,000-megalitre (240,000 acre⋅ft) capacity dam cost A$240 million to complete and was intended to assist the social and economic growth of the region.

The dam has been the centre of a controversial fishway designed to allow movement of fish upstream and downstream of the dam wall, including the endangered Queensland lungfish.

When the Paradise Dam is full, water is released over a stepped spillway followed by a stilling basin. The spillway chute is 335 metres (1,099 ft) wide with a smooth ogee profile, ending a few small steps leading to 1V:0.64H–stepped chute with a step height of 0.62 metres (2 ft 0 in). The chute is followed by a stilling basin before rejoining the natural river course. Between 2010 and 2013, the spillway system passed four major events, thus mitigating the effects of flood in the downstream catchment including the city of Bundaberg. The peak discharges were experienced in December 2010, January 2011, January 2013 and in March 2013.

=== Structural concerns ===
In September 2019, concerns about the structural stability of the dam resulted in the water levels in the dam being lowered to 42% of its maximum capacity. Construction to lower the dam wall height by 5.8 metres (19 ft) started in May 2020, under contract to CPB Contractors. In 2020, a report found that the roller-compacted concrete was "intrinsically incapable" of achieving the required standard for safety. In 2024, it was announced that the dam would be functionally replaced with an entirely new dam due to these concerns.

=== Financial concerns ===
In May 2026, the Sunwater Board voted to abandon a critical rebuild of the Paradise Dam wall as it was projected to cost $4.4bn, and that the cost was "grossly disproportionate" and that the proposal should be "no further considered". Days after this, the chief executive resigned. Despite this, the LNP government committed to proceed with the project.

== Fishways ==
An upstream fishway, known as the upstream fishlift, was installed on the dam for a cost of A$12 million. It consists of a 7,500-litre (1,600 imp gal; 2,000 US gal) caged container known as the hopper that sits at the downstream base of the dam wall. When operating, water is passed through the hopper to attract fish into it. The hopper is lifted over the dam wall to release any fish that have entered the hopper into the reservoir. The hopper is then returned to the base of the dam and the cycle repeated.

A downstream fishway, known as the downstream fishlock, was installed on the dam for a cost of A$8 million. It consists of an inlet chamber on the upstream side of the dam wall in the reservoir and a pipe to the downstream side of the dam. When operating, fish are attracted into the inlet chamber by flowing water. The downstream fishway was not operated from the completion of the dam in December 2005 until February 2009 due to water levels in the dam being beneath the entrance of the fishway. Since the dam commenced operation, the upstream and downstream fishways have not operated for approximately 60% of the time due to a combination of low water levels, mechanical failure, and being shut-down. Operation of the fishway has been limited to only those time when there are low and medium flow releases.

SunWater released final fishway monitoring reports in 2012 for the upstream fishway and the downstream fishway. 25 species different species have been recorded successfully using the upstream fishway. No lungfish have been recorded using the downstream fishway and very few have been recorded using the upstream fishway. The monitoring indicates that large bodied fish (lungfish, barramundi, mullet, bass) are not using the fishways. A conservation group unsuccessfully challenged the lack of operation of the fishways on the Paradise Dam in court proceedings in 2008–2010.

== See also ==
- List of dams and reservoirs in Queensland
