= Biggenden =

- Town
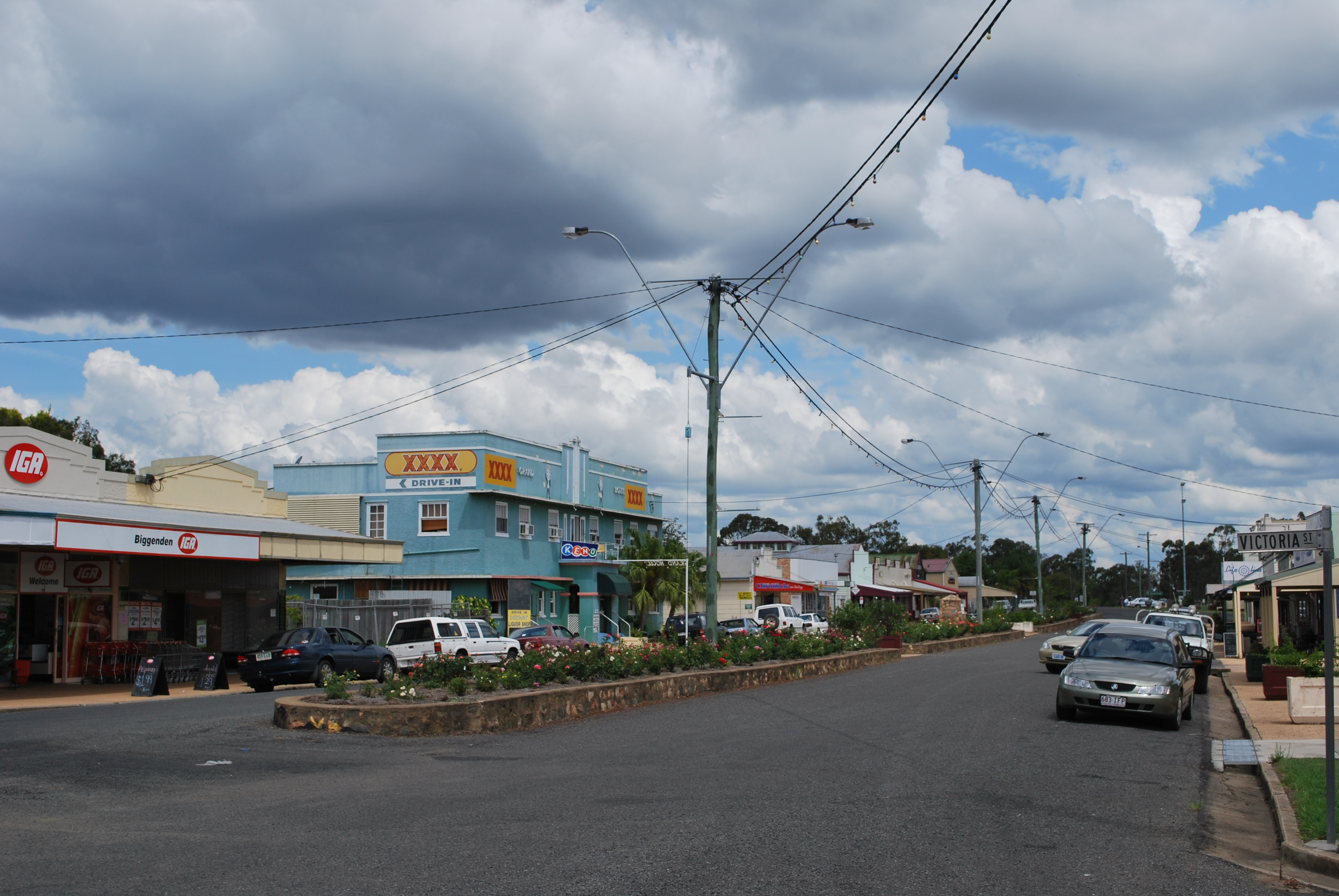
- Biggenden's main street

- Interactive map of Biggenden
- Coordinates: 25.5113°S 152.0461°E
- Country: Australia
- State: Queensland
- LGA: North Burnett Region
- Location: 46.2 km (28.7 mi) SW of Childers; 64.3 km (40.0 mi) ENE of Gayndah; 84.7 km (52.6 mi) W of Maryborough; 331 km (206 mi) NNW of Brisbane
- Established: 1889

Government
  - State electorate: Callide
  - Federal division: Hinkler

Area
  - Total: 218.6 km^{2} (84.4 sq mi)

Population
  - Total: 788 (2021 census)
  - Density: 3.6048/km^{2} (9.336/sq mi)
- Time zone: UTC+10:00 (AEST)
- Postcode: 4621
Localities around Biggenden
Didcot	Degilbo	Woowoonga
Coalstoun Lakes	Biggenden	Lakeside
Dundarrah	Stockhaven	Boompa

Biggenden is a rural town and locality in the North Burnett Region, Queensland, Australia. In the 2021 census, the locality of Biggenden had a population of 788 people.

== Geography ==
Biggenden is on the Isis Highway 287 kilometres (178 mi) north-west of the state capital Brisbane, and 85 kilometres (53 mi) west of Maryborough.

== History ==
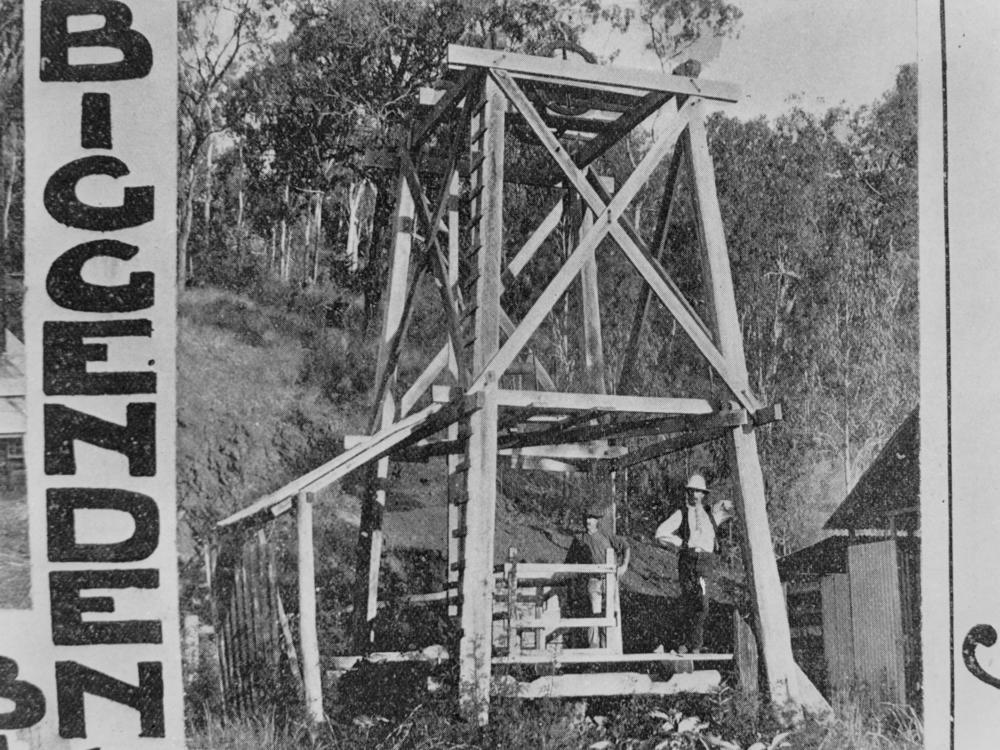
Biggenden Bismuth Mine, 1908

The name is derived from the Kabi word bigindhan meaning a place of stringybark.

Biggenden was founded in 1889 as a service centre to the short-lived goldrush towns of Paradise and Shamrock; and for coach passengers travelling west from Maryborough. The township, including the intriguingly named Live And Let Live Inn, moved to a new location alongside the railway station when the rail line arrived in 1891. Biggenden Post Office opened on 16 May 1891.

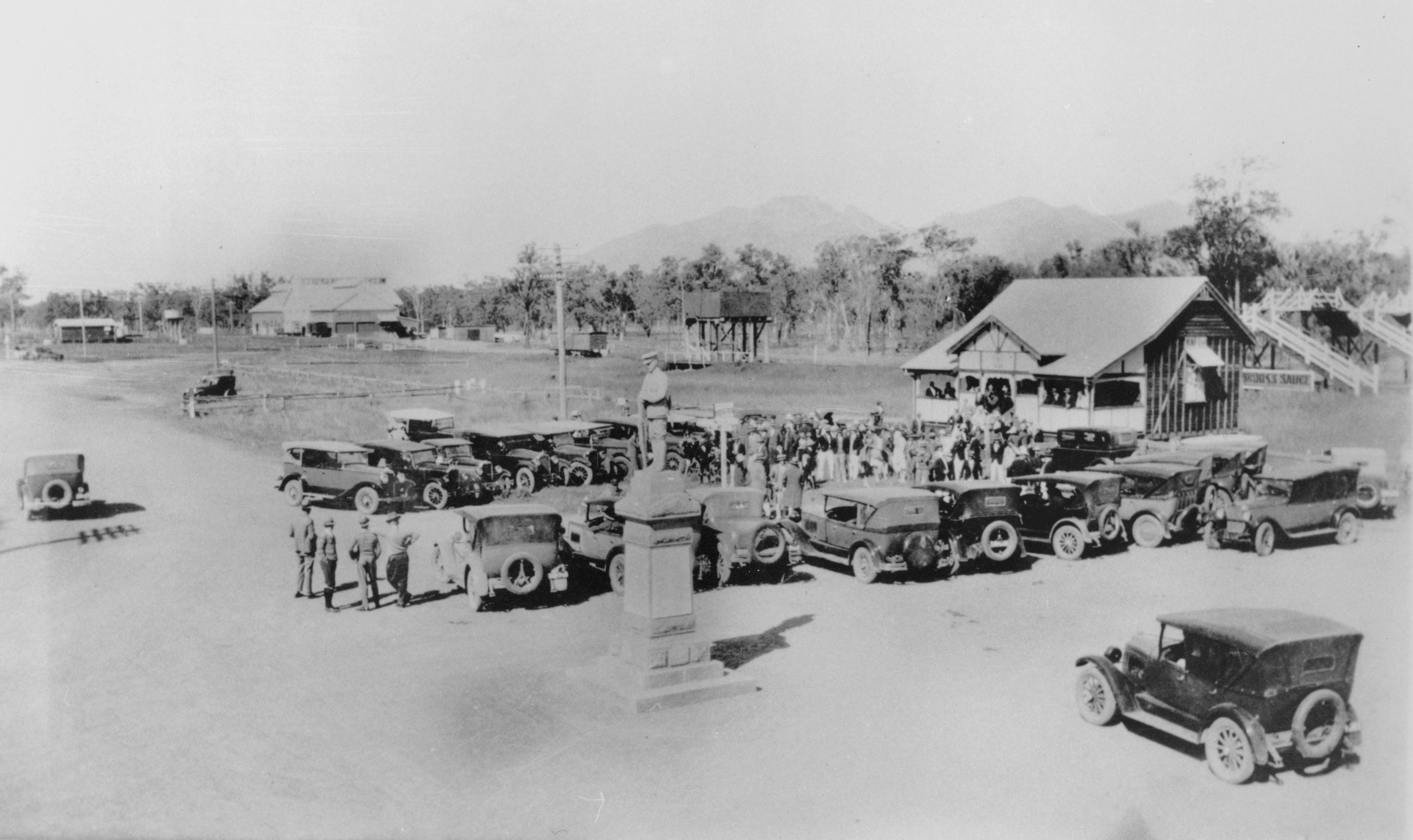
Opening of the Biggenden CWA building, October 1928

Biggenden Provisional school opened on 9 May 1892 becoming Biggenden State School in 1900. In January 1953, the school experimented with offering high school subjects by correspondence. In 1958, a secondary school section was added.

The Biggenden Methodist Church opened on Monday 23 May 1910. In 1939, a church hall was established, using the Methodist Church building established in Woowoonga in 1919, which had formerly been the Methodist church in Mount Perry, built in 1872. In 1977 through the amalgamation that created the Uniting Church in Australia, it became Biggenden Uniting Church.

In June 1926, a meeting of local women decided to establish a branch of the Queensland Country Women's Association. In October 1928, the Biggenden branch's building was officially opened by J.C. Robertson, chairman of the Degilbo Shire Council.

The Mt Biggenden mine provided employment to the local community for over a hundred years, before its magnetite iron ore operation closed in 1999.

== Demographics ==
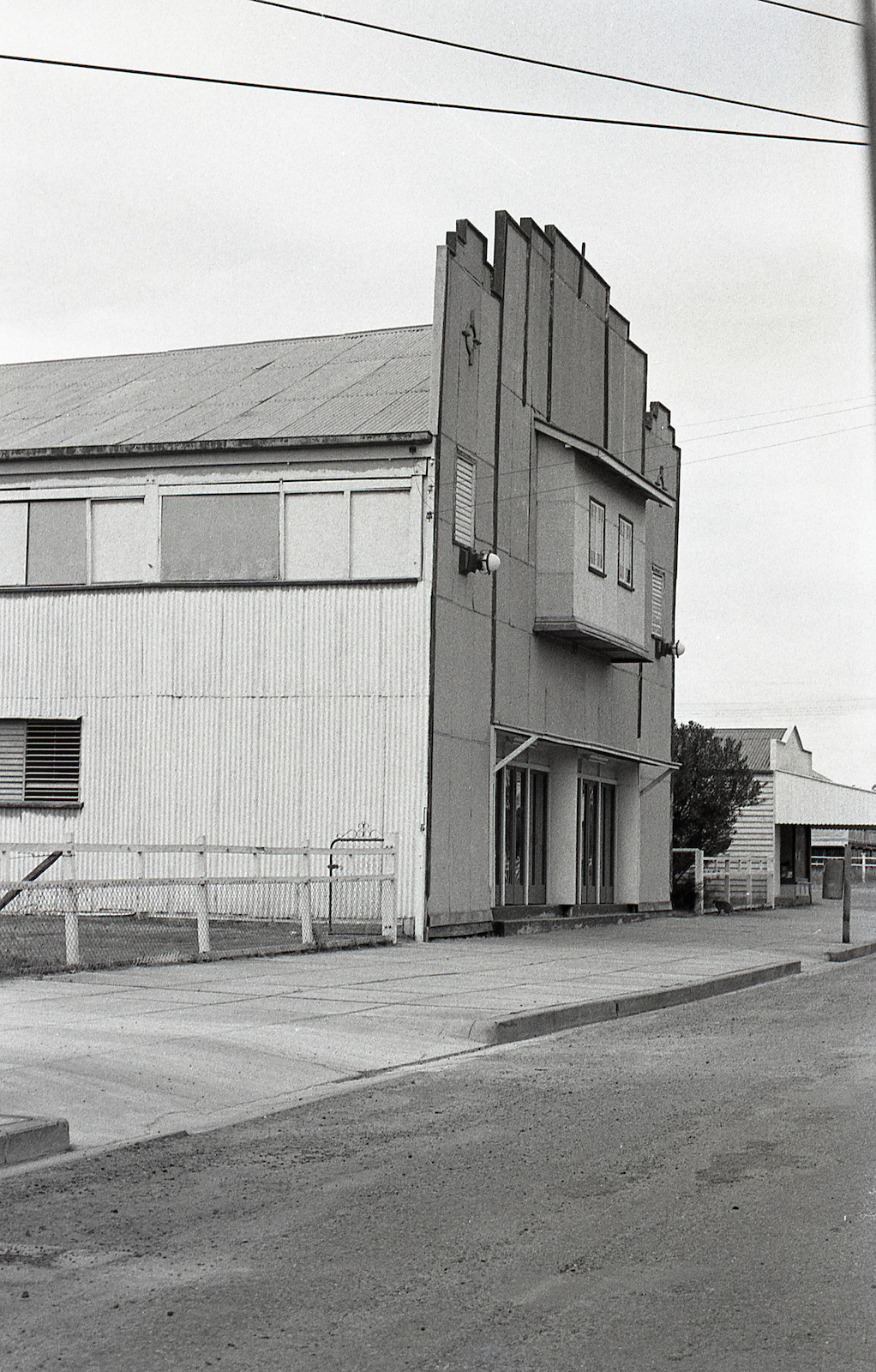
Picture Theatre, Biggenden, Queensland, 1975

In the 2011 census, Biggenden had a population of 682 people.

In the 2016 census, the locality of Biggenden had a population of 845 people.

In the 2021 census, the locality of Biggenden had a population of 788 people.

== Economy ==
Primary production is the most significant industry in the shire with beef and dairy cattle being predominant. Other agricultural pursuits include grain crops, piggeries, peanuts, citrus and timber. The area is also rich in minerals.

Biggenden Mine is located eight kilometres out of town off Ban Ban Springs Road. Gold, bismuth and more recently magnetite have been extracted from the mine. The township is also close to Coalstoun Lakes National Park and Mount Walsh National Park.

== Paradise Dam ==
In November 2005, the Queensland Government opened the Paradise Dam, about 30 minutes north-west of Biggenden, on the Burnett River. The 300,000ML dam, which submerges the former gold mining town of the same name, is touted as securing the future of the nearby Bundaberg and Childers region, although no water will be available for residents of the Biggenden area. However, more than 400 jobs were created during its construction and the dam site is proving to be one of the shire's largest tourist attraction. Artefacts and buildings removed from Paradise before the dam wall was built are now on display by the Biggenden Historical Society, which operates from the relocated Paradise courthouse.

== Education ==
Biggenden State School is a government primary and secondary (Prep–10) school for boys and girls at 3–9 Frederick Street (25.5107°S 152.0474°E). In 2017, the school had an enrolment of 143 students with 18 teachers (16 full-time equivalent) and 12 non-teaching staff (8 full-time equivalent).

The nearest government secondary schools providing education to Year 12 are Burnett State College in Gayndah to the west and Isis District State High School in Childers to the north-east.

== Heritage listings ==
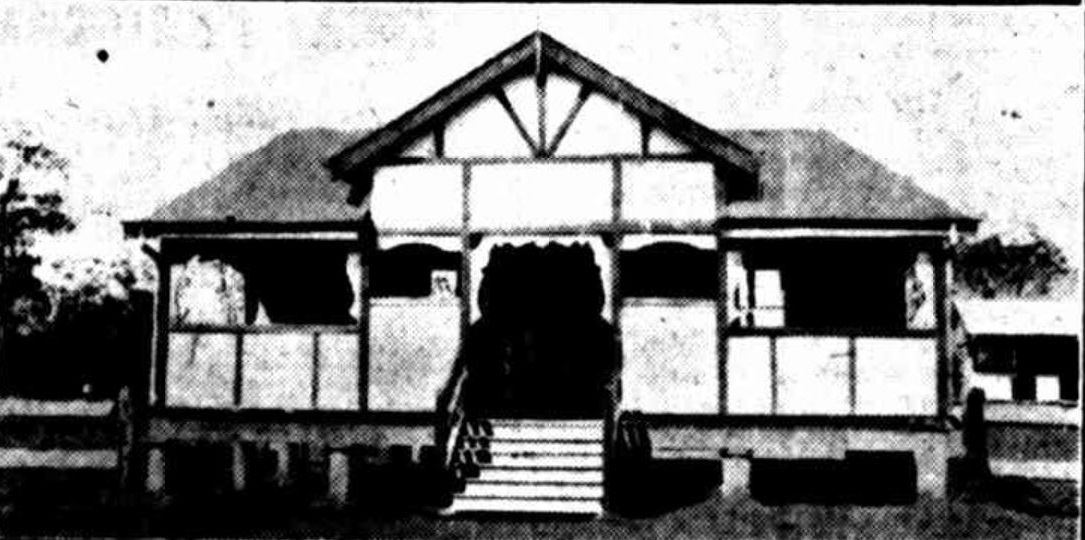
Biggenden CWA building, 1928

Biggenden has a number of heritage-listed sites:

- former Biggenden Courthouse (now Biggenden Museum), 8 Edward Street
- former Biggenden Butter Factory, 11 Edward Street & Airstrip Road
- Biggenden QCWA Building, 32 Edward Street

== Amenities ==
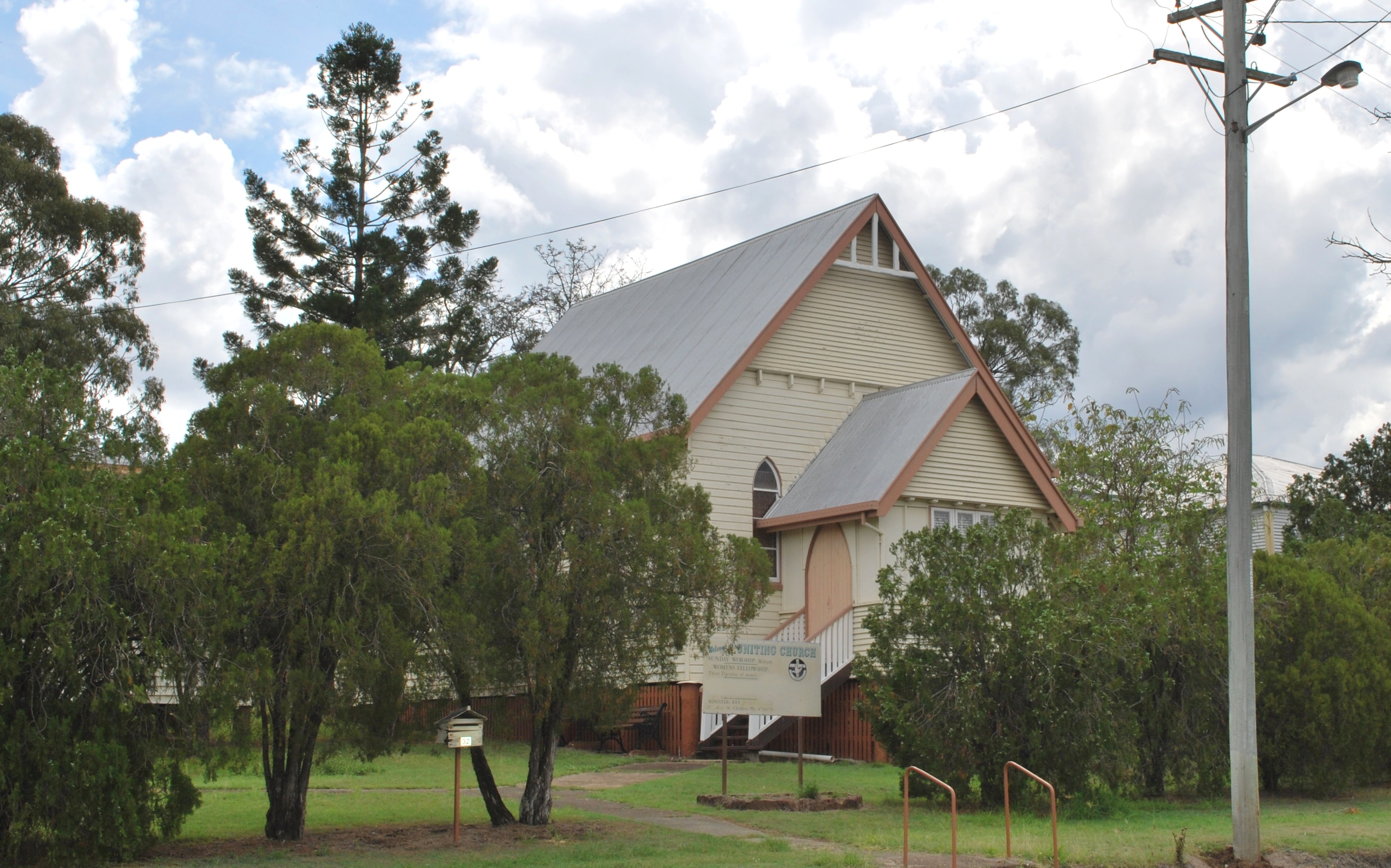
Biggenden Uniting Church, 2008

Biggenden has a public library, swimming pool, bowling and golf club, memorial hall and showground.

The North Burnett Regional Council operates the Biggenden Library, located at 47 Edward Street, Biggenden.

The Biggenden branch of the Queensland Country Women's Association meets at the CWA Hall at 32 Edward Street.

Biggenden Uniting Church is at 32 George Street (25.5102°S 152.0444°E).

== See also ==
- Shire of Biggenden (1905–2008)
